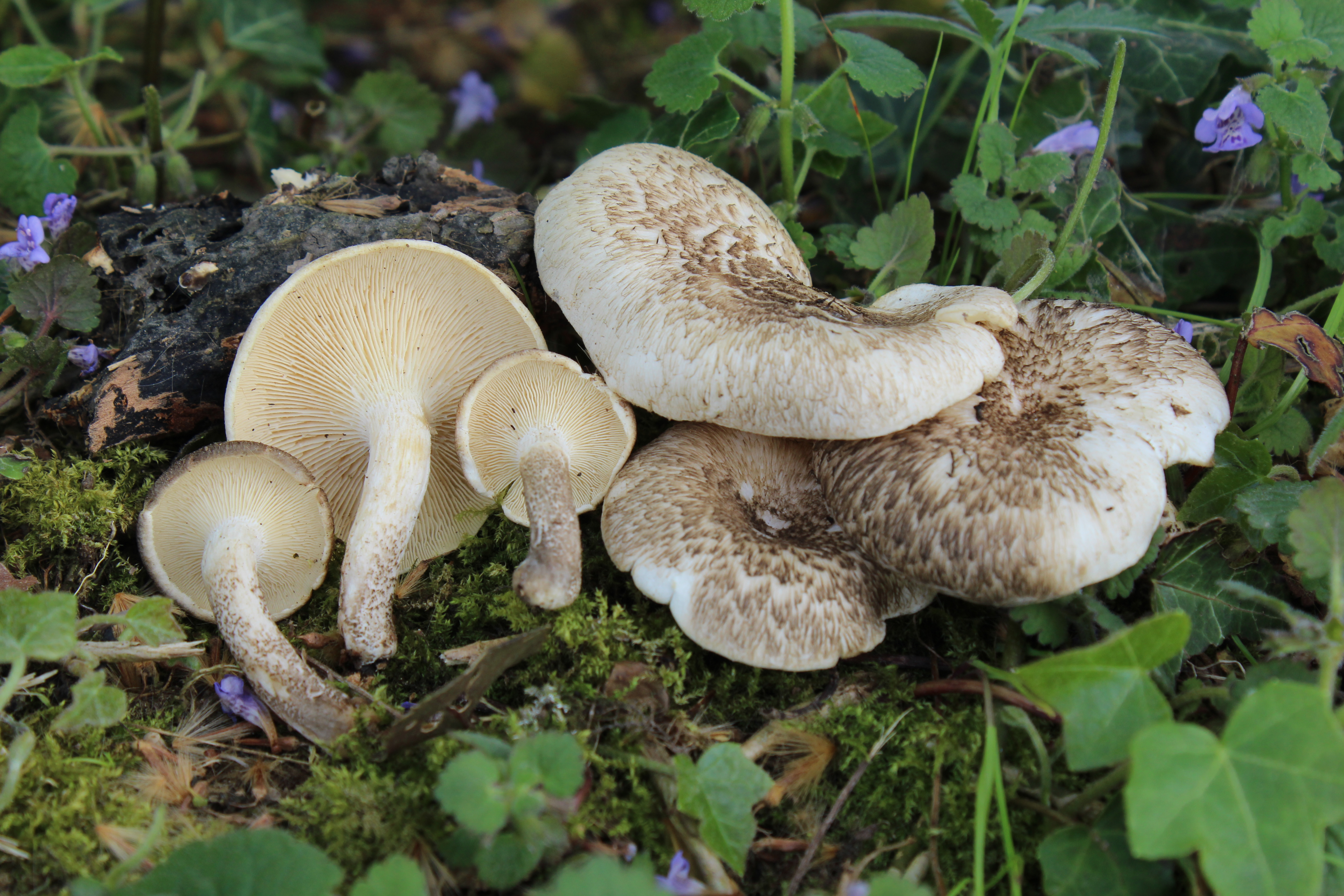
- Lentinus tigrinus, Italy

Scientific classification
- Kingdom: Fungi
- Division: Basidiomycota
- Class: Agaricomycetes
- Order: Polyporales
- Family: Polyporaceae
- Genus: Lentinus; Fr. (1825)

Type species
- Lentinus crinitus (L.) Fr. (1825)

Synonyms
- Pocillaria P.Browne (1756); Digitellus Paulet (1791); Lentodium Morgan (1895); Lentodiellum Murrill (1915)

= Lentinus =

Genus of fungi

Lentinus is a genus of fungi in the family Polyporaceae. The genus is widely distributed, with many species found in subtropical regions.

The genus name Lentinus is derived from the Latin lent, meaning "pliable", and inus, meaning "resembling".

Fungi of this genus have been recorded as occasional food of the pleasing fungus beetle Dacne quadrimaculata, but this might actually refer to Neolentinus as its known food species N. lepideus was formerly placed in Lentinus (see below). Also, the Polyporaceae "Panus strigosus" – an ambiguous and obsolete name that occasionally was used for some species now in Lentinus – has been claimed as food of the pleasing fungus beetle Triplax flavicollis; as this species has otherwise been noted to eat the common oyster mushroom Pleurotus ostreatus exclusively, the "P. strigosus" claim is probably erroneous.

== Species ==
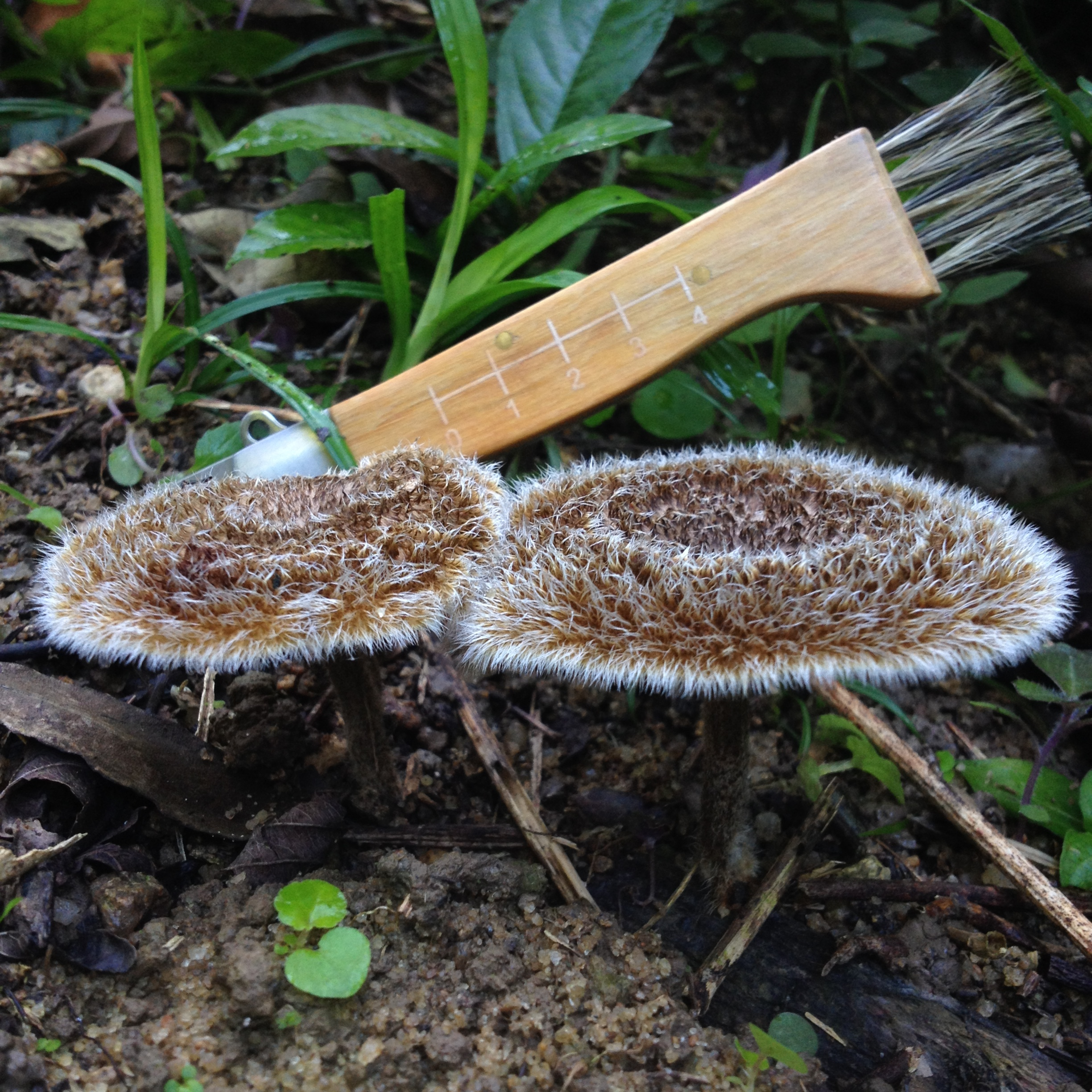
Lentinus berteroi, Brazil

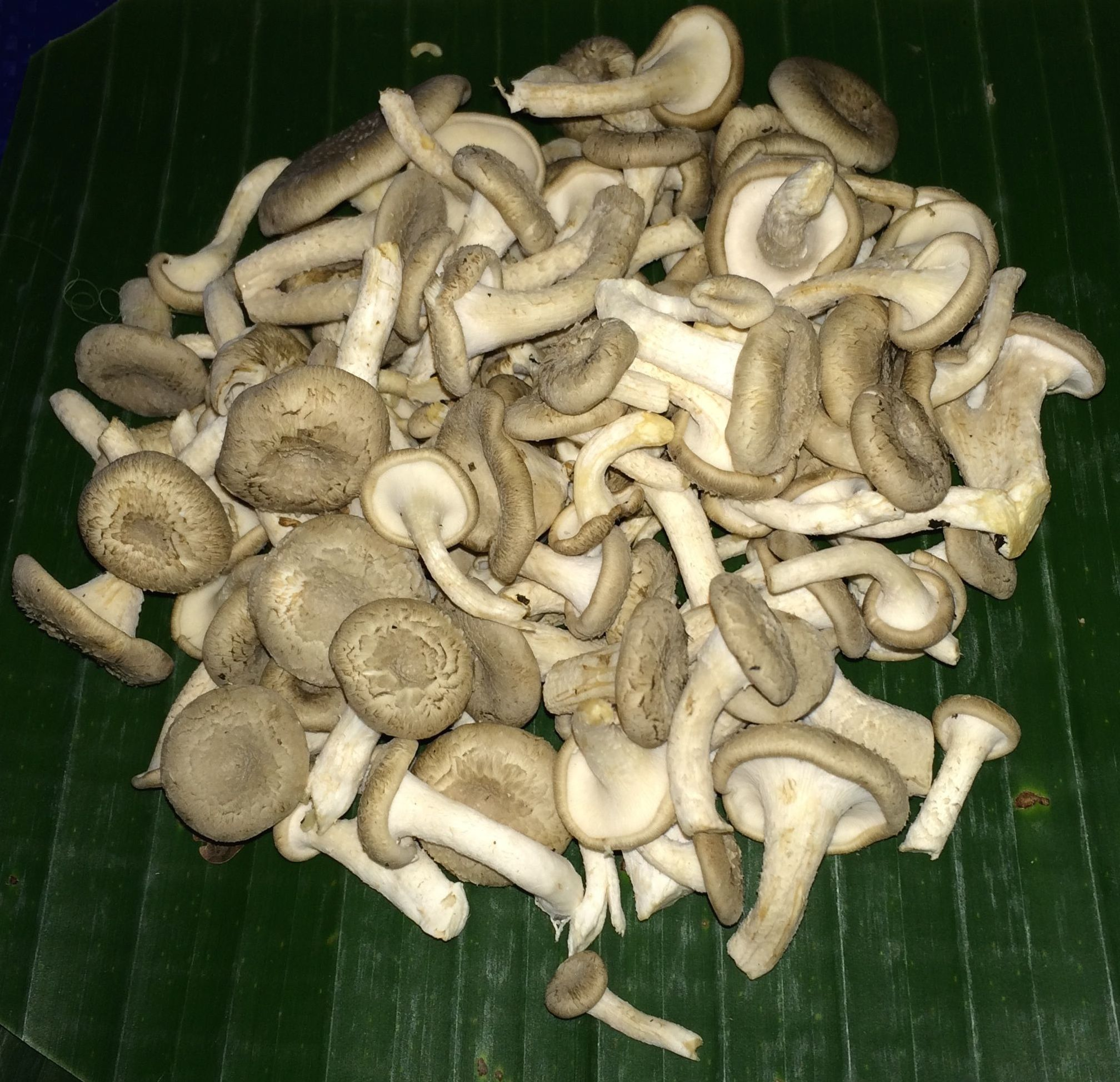
Lentinus squarrosulus

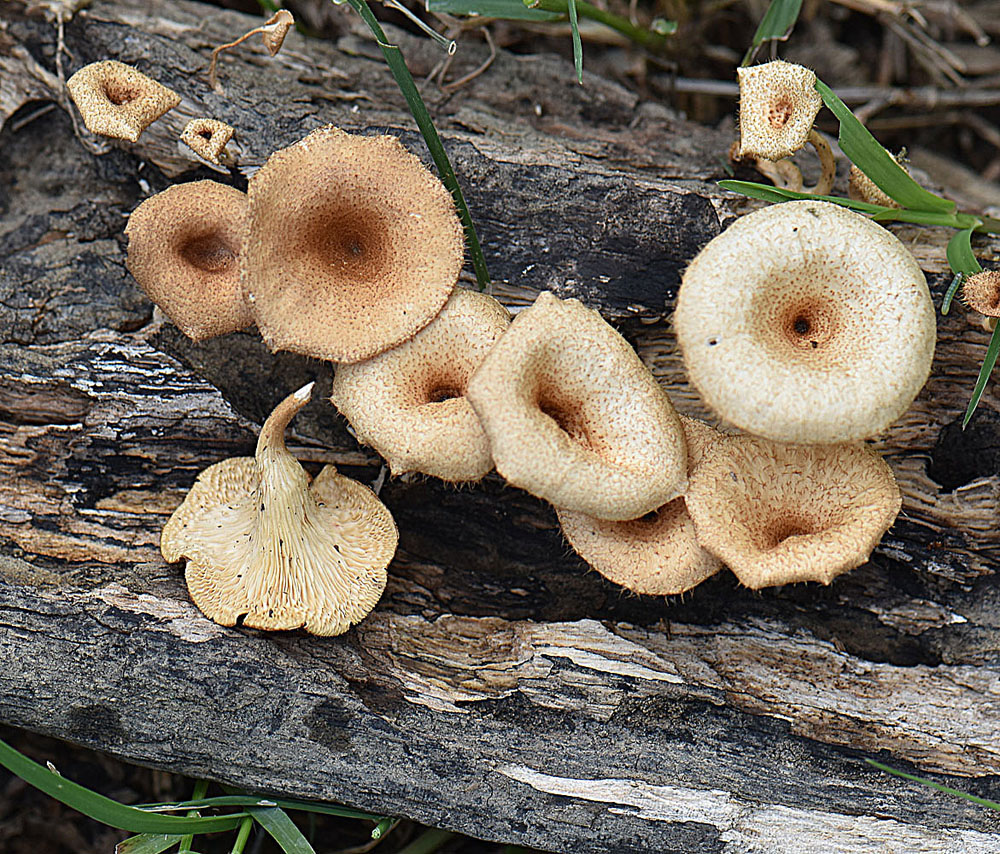
Lentinus swartzii, Panama

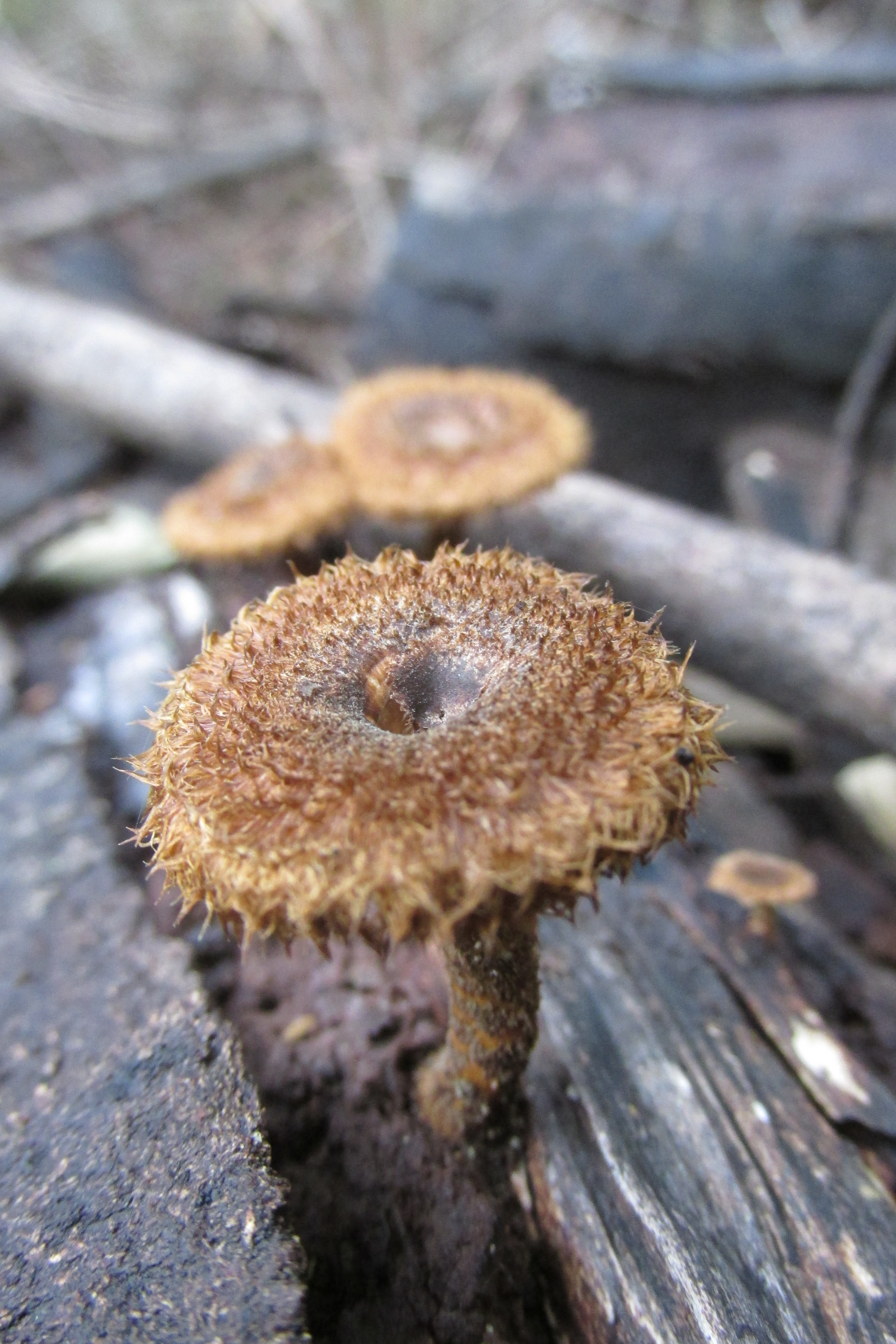
Lentinus stuppeus, South Africa

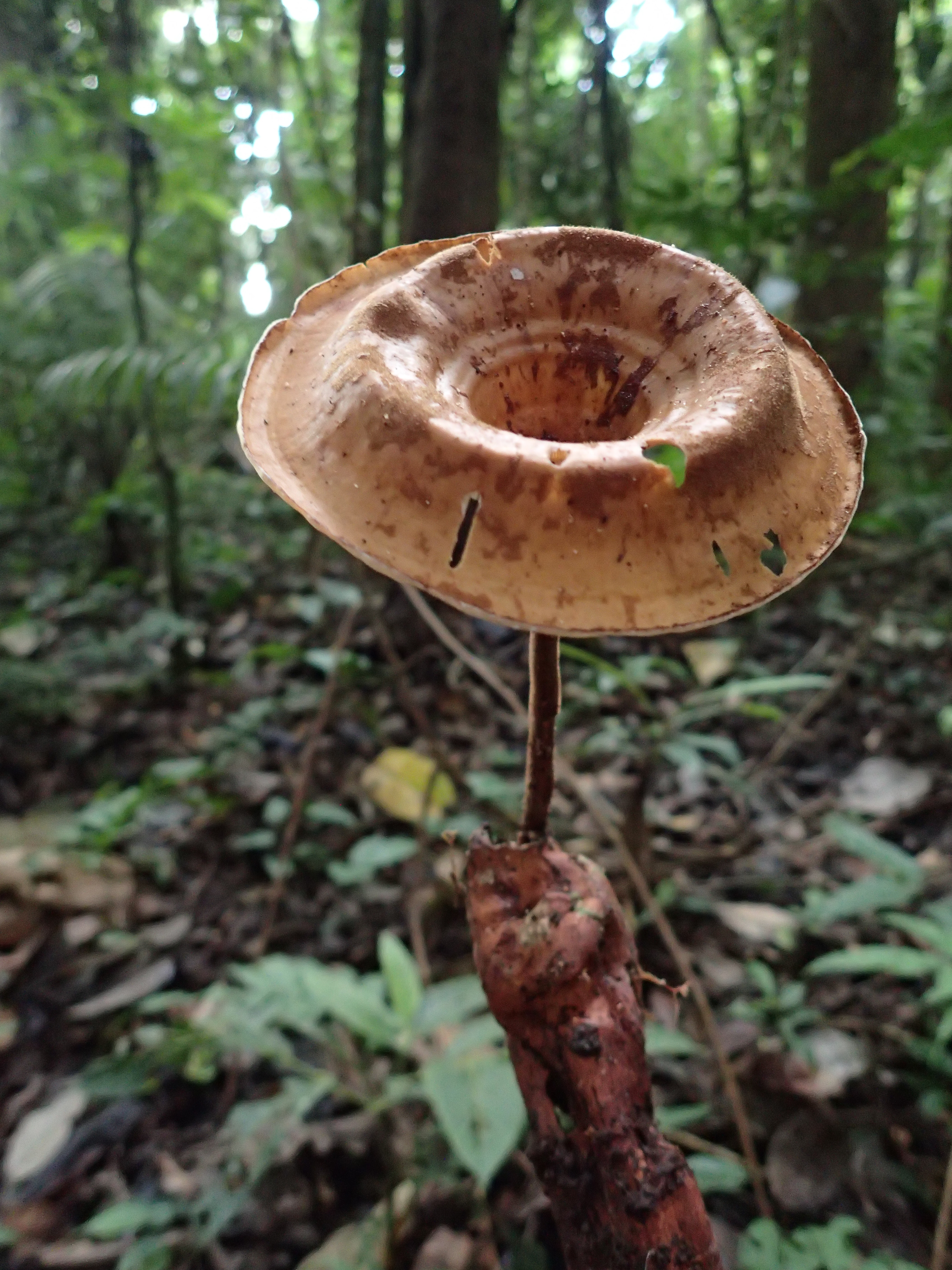
Lentinus velutinus, Ecuador

The genus Lentinus has historically been used as something of a "wastebin taxon" for various "gilled polypores", regardless of their actual relationships. Following the discovery that they actually belong in order Gloeophyllales, some well-known species – such as "L." lepideus (scaly sawgill) and "L." ponderosus (giant sawgill) – have been moved to a newly-established genus Neolentinus.

Even more recently, molecular data placed some presumed Polyporus species within the Lentinus radiation, and additional species such as Neofavolus suavissimus or Polyporus ciliatus may also belong here.

As of July 2017, Index Fungorum accepts 120 species of Lentinus. The genus includes:

- L. anastomosans Rick (1938)
- L. anthocephalus (Lév.) Pegler (1971)
- L. araucariae Har. & Pat. (1903)
- L. arcularius (Batsch) Zmitr. (2010)
- L. atrobrunneus Pegler (1971)
- L. badius (Berk.) Berk. (1847)
- L. baguirmiensis Pat. & Har. (1908)
- L. bambusinus T.K.A.Kumar & Manim. (2005)
- L. berteroi (Fr.) Fr. (1825)
- L. brumalis (Pers.) Zmitr. (2010)
- L. brunneofloccosus Pegler (1971)
- L. caesariatus Pat. (1924)
- L. calyx (Speg.) Pegler (1983)
- L. campinensis Teixeira (1946)
- L. candidus P.W.Graff (1913)
- L. chordalis Lloyd (1919)
- L. chudaei Har. & Pat. (1912)
- L. cochlearis (Pers.) Bres. (1903)
- L. concavus (Berk.) Corner (1981)
- L. concentricus Karun., K.D.Hyde & Zhu L.Yang (2011)
- L. concinnus Pat. (1892)
- L. connatus Berk. (1842)
- L. copulatus (Ehrenb.) Henn. (1898)
- L. cordubensis Speg. (1902)
- L. courtetianus Har. & Pat. (1909)
- L. crinitus (L.) Fr. (1825)
- L. densifolius R.Heim & L.Rémy (1926)
- L. dicholamellatus Manim. (2004)
- L. egregius Massee (1910)
- L. elmeri Bres. (1912)
- L. elmerianus Lloyd (1922)
- L. erosus Lloyd (1925)
- L. erringtonii Pat. & Har. (1900)
- L. fasciatus Berk. (1840)
- L. favoloides R.Heim (1964)
- L. flexipes Zmitr. & Kovalenko (2016)
- L. floridanus (Murrill) Murrill (1943)
- L. fluxus Herp. (1912)
- L. freemanii Murrill (1919)
- L. fuscoexactus Lloyd (1922)
- L. fuscus Lloyd (1925)
- L. fusipes Cooke & Massee (1887)
- L. gibbsiae A.L.Sm. (1909)
- L. glabratus Mont. (1842)
- L. gogoensis Har. & Pat. (1909)
- L. goossensiae Beeli (1928)
- L. graminicola Murrill (1911)
- L. huensis Lloyd (1922)
- L. integrus Reichert (1921)
- L. inverseconicus Pat. (1923)
- L. isabellina Lloyd (1922)
- L. lagunensis P.W.Graff (1913)
- L. lamelliporus Har. & Pat. (1902)
- L. lateripes Lloyd (1922)
- L. ledermannii Pilát (1936)
- L. levis (Berk. & M.A.Curtis) Murrill (1915) (edible when young)
- L. lividus Beeli (1928)
- L. luteoapplanatus Beeli (1928)
- L. macgregorii P.W.Graff (1913)
- L. martianoffianus Kalchbr. (1877)
- L. megacystidiatus Karun., K.D.Hyde & Zhu L.Yang (2011)
- L. melzeri Velen. (1920)
- L. meridionalis (A. David) Jargeat, Corriol & J.-P. Chaumeton (2023)
- L. metatensis Bacc. (1917)
- L. mitissimus Bigeard & H.Guill. (1913)
- L. mollipes Pat. (1917)
- L. nigro-osseus Pilát (1936)
- L. nigroglaber Lloyd (1923)
- L. nigroglabrus Lloyd (1923)
- L. ochraceus Lloyd (1920)
- L. ochroleucus Beeli (1928)
- L. omphalopsis Reichert (1921)
- L. orizabensis Murrill (1915)
- L. palauensis Imazeki (1941)
- L. palmeri (Earle) Sacc. & Traverso (1911)
- L. panziensis Singer (1973)
- L. papillatus (Henn.) Henn. (1905)
- L. pertenuis Lloyd (1922)
- L. phillipsii Van der Byl (1926)
- L. pholiotaeformis Velen. (1939)
- L. pilososquamulosus Lj.N.Vassiljeva (1973)
- L. piperatus Beeli (1928)
- L. polychrous Lév. (1844)
- L. prancei Singer (1981)
- L. prolifer (Pat. & Har.) D.A.Reid (1977)
- L. pulcherrimus Sumst. (1907)
- L. ramosii Lloyd (1923)
- L. ramosipes Har. & Pat. (1909)
- L. retinervis Pegler (1983)
- L. roseus Karun., K.D.Hyde & Zhu L.Yang (2011)
- L. rubescens Velen. (1939)
- L. sajor-caju (Fr.) Fr. (1838)
- L. samarensis Pilát (1941)
- L. sayanus Singer (1952)
- L. sclerogenus Sacc. (1916)
- L. scleropus (Pers.) Fr. (1836)
- L. sibiricus Pilát (1936)
- L. similans (Earle) Sacc. & Traverso (1911)
- L. squamosus Quél. (1888)
- L. squarrosulus Mont. (1842)
- L. striatulus Lév. (1846)
- L. strigosus Fr. (1825)
- L. stuppeus Klotzsch (1833)
- L. subdulcis Berk. (1851)
- L. subscyphoides Murrill (1911)
- L. swartzii Berk. (1843)
- L. terrestris Lloyd (1925)
- L. thomensis Cout. (1925)
- L. tigrinoides Corner (1981)
- L. tigrinus (Bull.) Fr. (1825)
- L. tuber-regium (Fr.) Fr. (1836)
- L. umbrinus Reichardt (1866)
- L. velutinus Fr. (1830)
- L. vestidus (Earle) Sacc. & Traverso (1912)
- L. villosus Klotzsch (1833)
- L. zelandicus Sacc. & Cub. (1887)
- L. zenkerianus Henn. (1905)
- L. zeyheri Berk. (1843)
