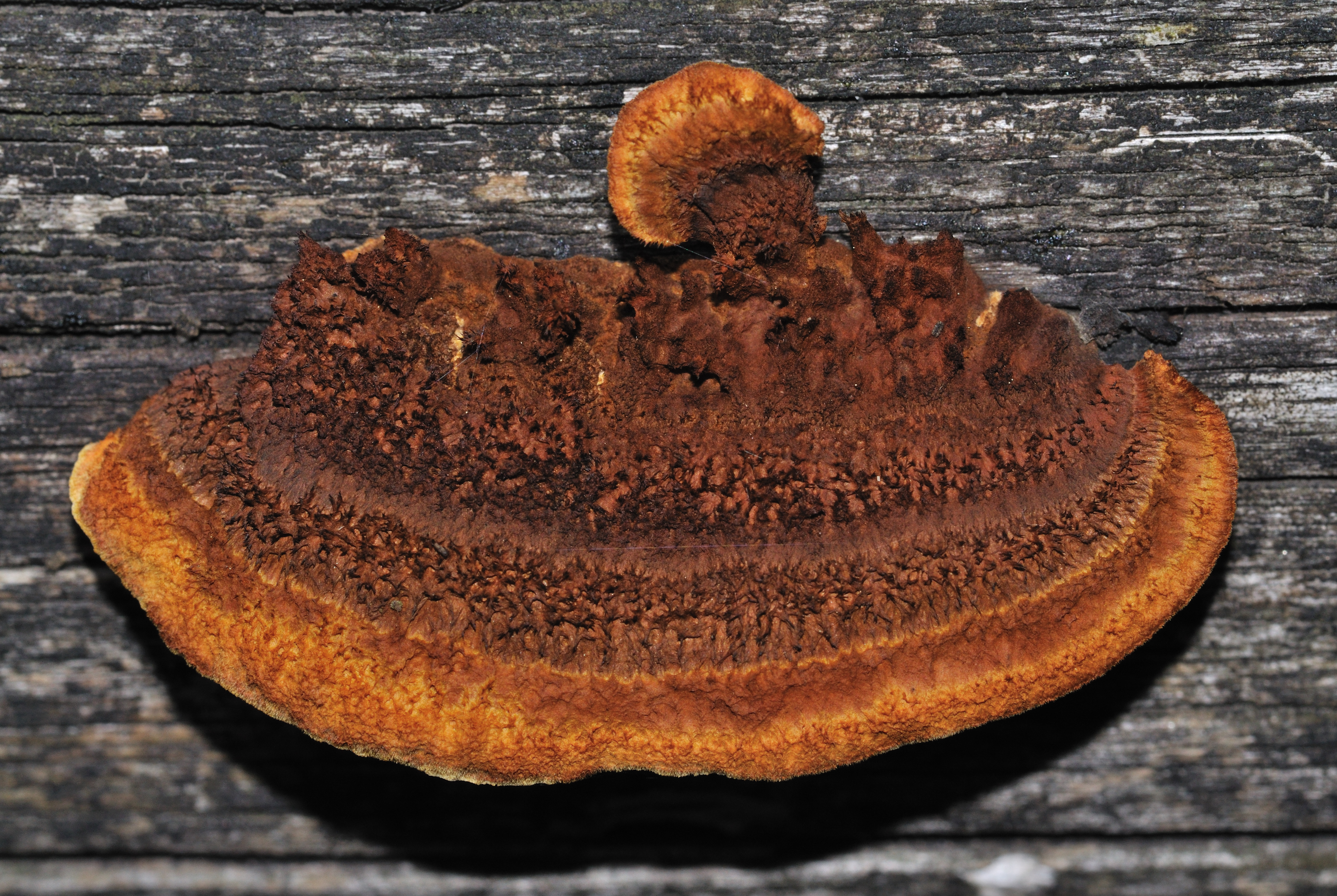

Scientific classification
- Kingdom: Fungi
- Division: Basidiomycota
- Class: Agaricomycetes
- Order: Gloeophyllales
- Family: Gloeophyllaceae
- Genus: Gloeophyllum
- Species: G. sepiarium

Binomial name
- Gloeophyllum sepiarium (Wulfen) P. Karst., (1879)

Synonyms
- Agaricus asserculorum Batsch, (1783); Agaricus boletiformis Sowerby, (1809); Agaricus sepiarius Wulfen, (1786); Agaricus undulatus Hoffm., (1797); Daedalea confragosa var. tricolor (Fr.) Domanski, Orlos & Skirg., (1967); Daedalea sepiaria (Wulfen) Fr., (1821); Daedalea ungulata Lloyd, (1915); Gloeophyllum ungulatum (Lloyd) Imazeki, (1943); Lenzites argentina Speg., (1898); Lenzites sepiaria (Wulfen) Fr., (1889); Merulius sepiarius (Wulfen) Schrank, (1789)

= Gloeophyllum sepiarium =

Species of fungus

Gloeophyllum sepiarium
- Mycological characteristics
- Gills on hymenium
- No distinct cap
- Hymenium attachment is irregular or not applicable
- Lacks a stipe
- Spore print is white
- Ecology is saprotrophic
- Edibility is inedible

Gloeophyllum sepiarium, the rusty gilled polypore, is a wood decay fungus that causes a brown rot.

== Description ==
The cap is 1.5–15 centimetres (1/2–6 in) wide, loosely fan-shaped, brown with a yellow-orange margin during growth, velvety then smooth, and leathery with a mild odor and taste. The tissue darkens in KOH. The flesh is tannish.

The gills are adnate and close, light when fresh and darker both near the wood and in age. The spores are white, cylindrical, and smooth. The spore print is white.

The fruiting body grows for only one year, and produces spores in late summer and autumn. Its hymenial surface is distinctive from other polypores due to the presence of gills.

The species is inedible.

=== Similar species ===
Similar species include G. trabeum, Daedaleopsis confragosa, Daedalea quercina, Lenzites betulina, Trametes betulina, and T. versicolor.

== Habitat and distribution ==
It grows on dead conifers, both in the wild and on lumber.

It is found throughout North America.
