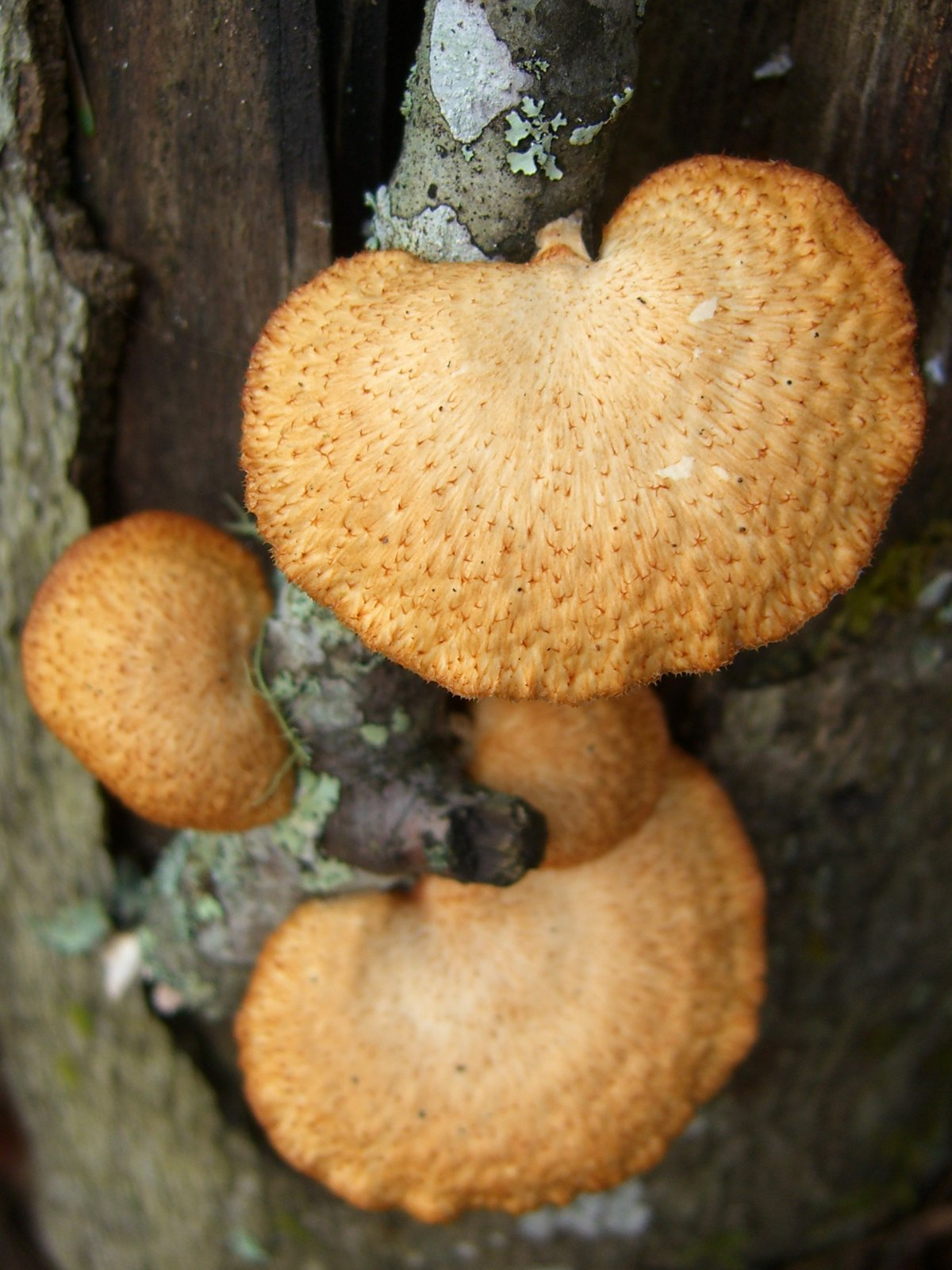
- Neofavolus alveolaris

Scientific classification
- Kingdom: Fungi
- Division: Basidiomycota
- Class: Agaricomycetes
- Order: Polyporales
- Family: Polyporaceae
- Genus: Neofavolus; Sotome & T.Hatt. (2012)

Type species
- Neofavolus alveolaris (DC.) Sotome & T.Hatt. (2012)

Species
- N. alveolaris N. cremeoalbidus N. mikawai N. suavissimus

= Neofavolus =

Genus of fungi

Neofavolus is a genus of four species of polypore fungi in the family Polyporaceae. All four known species of Neofavolus are known from temperate regions and unknown from the tropics. Neofavolus alveolaris, the type species, is widely distributed in the temperate areas of the Northern Hemisphere, while N. cremeoalbidus and N. mikawai are known only from limited areas of eastern Asia. The most recent addition to the genus (transferred from Lentinus), N. suavissimus, is found in North America, Europe, and Japan.

== Description ==
The fruit bodies of Neofavolus species are annual, and have a cylindrical stipe that is usually laterally situated. Their caps are kidney-shaped to semicircular, circular in centrally stipitate specimens. The cap surface is either covered with flatted scales or is smooth, azonate, white to cream or brownish. The context, which is up to 1 cm thick, ranges from fleshy-tough to leathery when fresh, to brittle or corky to leathery in dried specimens. Pores on the underside of the cap vary in size, but are typically diamond shaped and may be elongated radially. N. suavissimus is the single Neofavolus fungus with a hymenium featuring gills rather than pores.

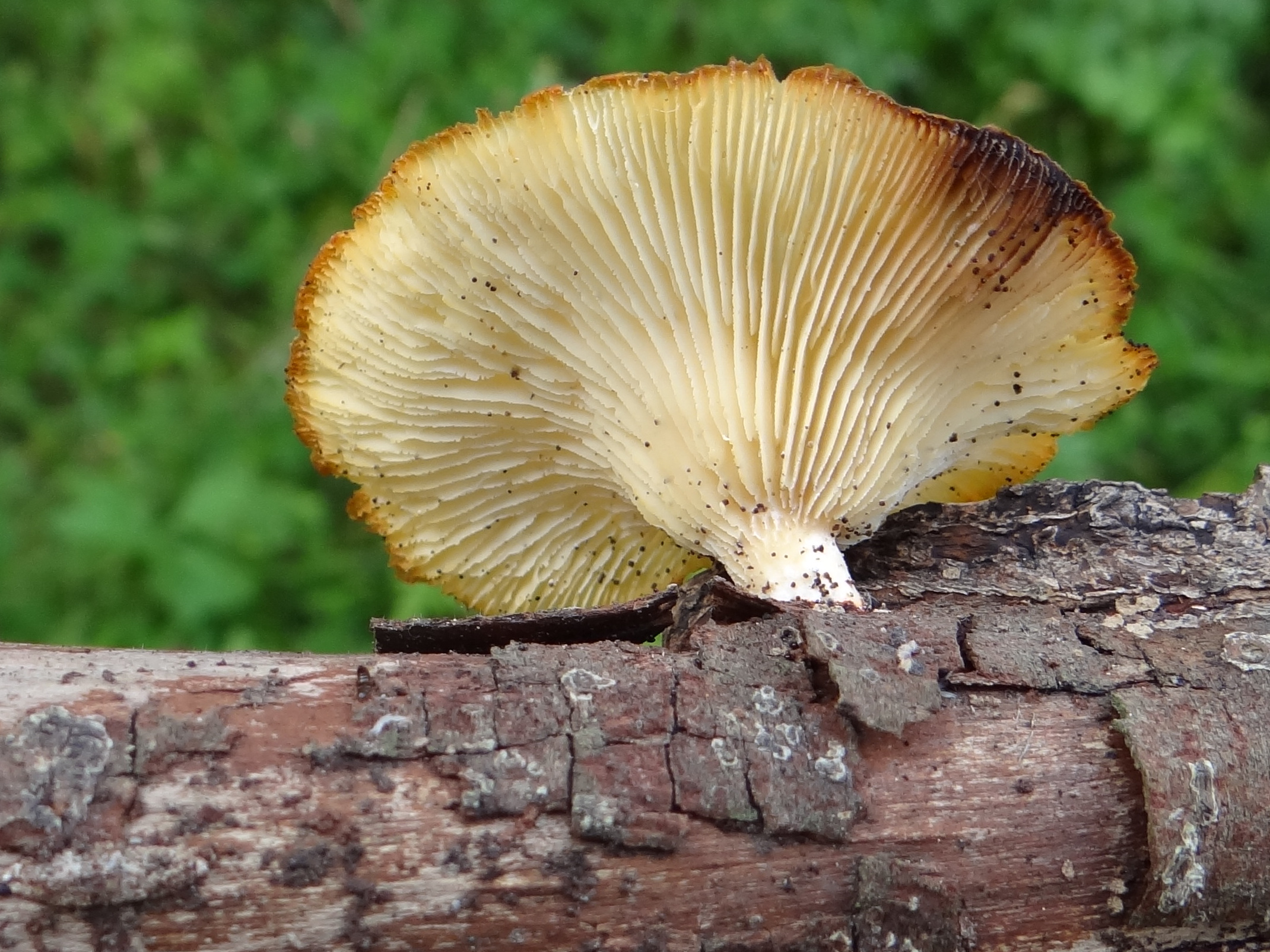
N. suavissimus

Neofavolus has a dimitic hyphal system, with both generative and the more predominant skeletal-binding hyphae. The generative hyphae have clamp connections. Skeletal-binding hyphae are arboriform, and hyaline. The cap cuticle comprises a cutis made of hyaline to brown agglutinated and parallel generative hyphae. These are distinct from the contextual hyphae, which largely comprise non-agglutinated skeletal-binding hyphae. The basidia are club-shaped, with four sterigmata. Spores of Neofavolus fungi are cylindrical, thin-walled, smooth, hyaline, and non-amyloid.

== Species ==
- Neofavolus alveolaris (DC.) Sotome & T.Hatt. (2016)
- Neofavolus cremeoalbidus Sotome & T.Hatt. (2013)
- Neofavolus mikawae (Lloyd) Sotome & T.Hatt. (2013)
- Neofavolus suavissimus (Fr.) J.S.Seelan, Justo & Hibbett (2016)
