= C23H28O7 =

The molecular formula C_{23}H_{28}O_{7} (molar mass: 416.464 g/mol, exact mass: 416.1835 u) may refer to:

- Gomisin A
- Hexacyclinol
