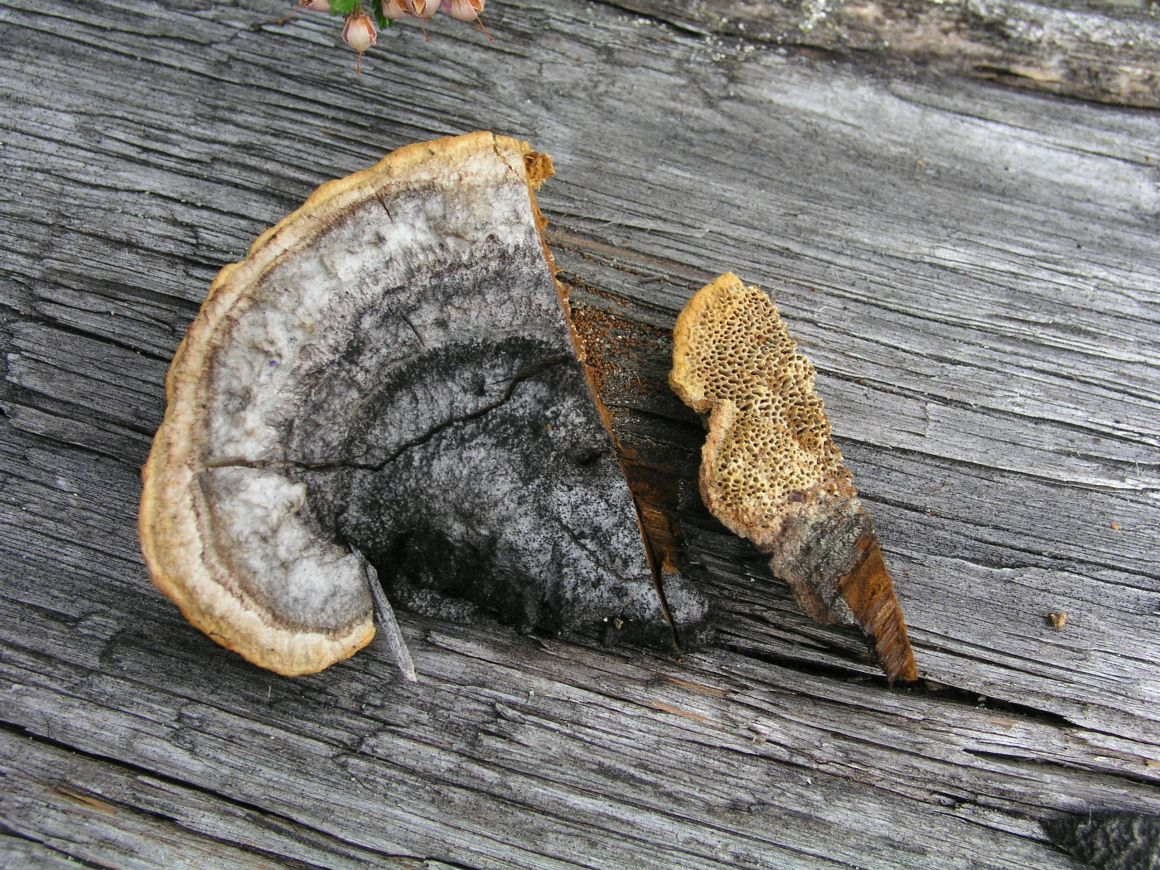

Scientific classification
- Domain: Eukaryota
- Kingdom: Fungi
- Division: Basidiomycota
- Class: Agaricomycetes
- Order: Gloeophyllales
- Family: Gloeophyllaceae
- Genus: Gloeophyllum
- Species: G. protractum

Binomial name
- Gloeophyllum protractum (Fr.) Imazeki

= Gloeophyllum protractum =

Species of fungus

Gloeophyllum protractum is a species of fungus belonging to the family Gloeophyllaceae.

It is native to Eurasia and Northern America.
