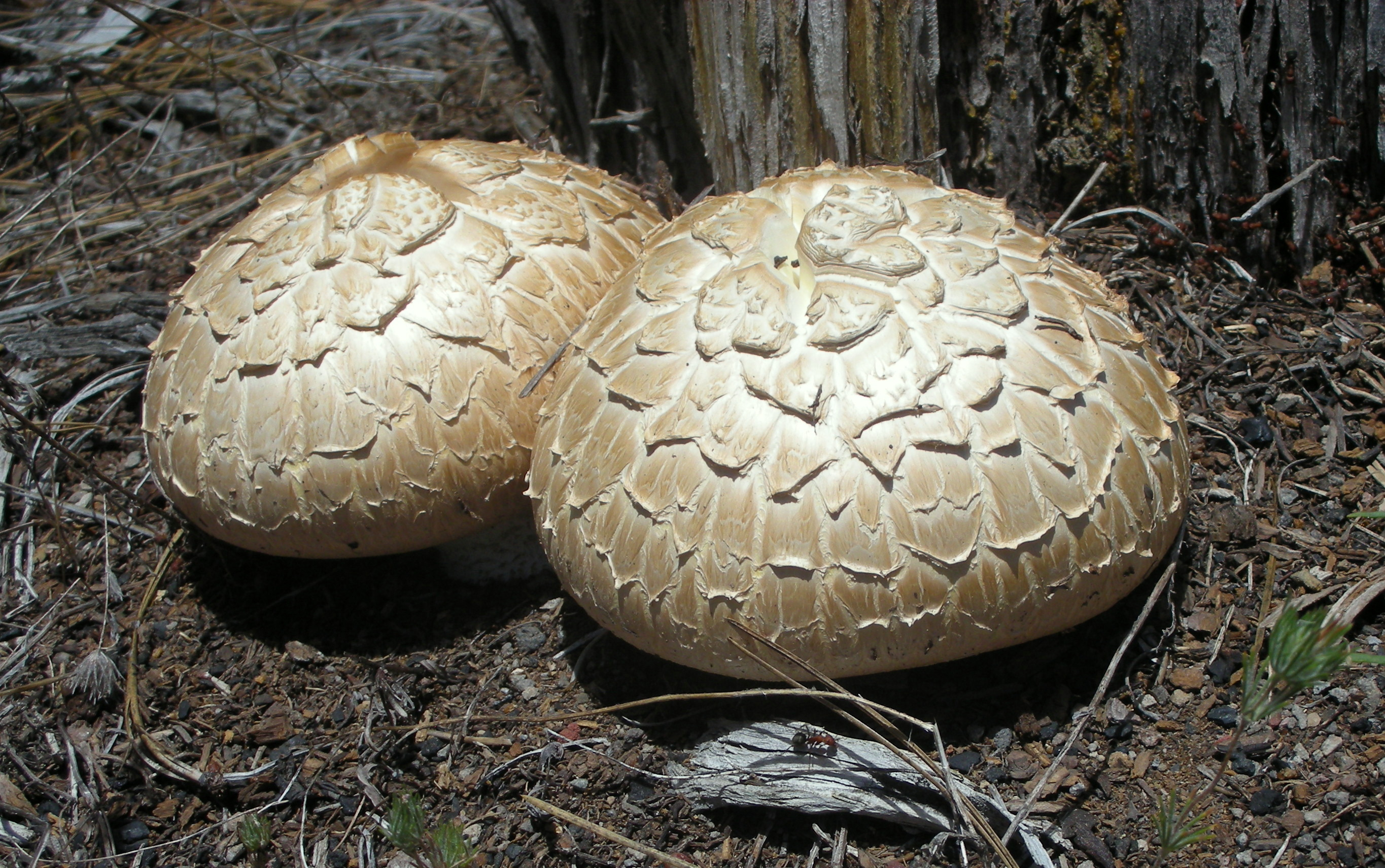

Scientific classification
- Kingdom: Fungi
- Division: Basidiomycota
- Class: Agaricomycetes
- Order: Gloeophyllales
- Family: Gloeophyllaceae
- Genus: Neolentinus
- Species: N. ponderosus

Binomial name
- Neolentinus ponderosus (O.K.Mill.) Redhead & Ginns (1985)

Synonyms
- Lentinus ponderosus O.K.Mill. (1965)

= Neolentinus ponderosus =

Species of fungus

Neolentinus ponderosus
- Mycological characteristics
- Gills on hymenium
- Cap is convex or depressed
- Hymenium is decurrent
- Stipe is bare
- Spore print is white
- Ecology is saprotrophic
- Edibility is choice

Neolentinus ponderosus, commonly known as the giant sawgill, or ponderous lentinus, is a species of fungus in the family Gloeophyllaceae. It was originally described in 1965 as a species of Lentinus by American mycologist Orson K. Miller. It is found in western North America.

== Taxonomy ==
The fungus was first described as Lentinellus montanus by Orson K. Miller, based on collections that he made in Idaho. In 1985 it was transferred to Neolentinus, a segregate genus created for Lentinus-type fungi that cause a brown rot in wood. The specific epithet ponderosa derives from the Latin word for "heavy".

== Description ==
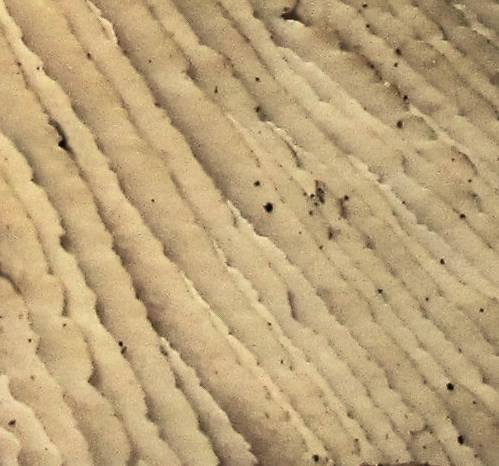
Closeup of gill serration

The fruit bodies have convex to flattened caps ranging from 5–50 centimetres (2–19 1/2 in) in diameter. The caps have small cinnamon-brown scales (squamules) on the surface and a margin that is usually curved inward initially. The narrow gills are adnate to decurrent and closely spaced, with intervening lamellulae (short gills) that extend about two-thirds of the distance to the stipe. The gill edges are serrated (notched like a saw, hence the common name). The gills are initially whitish before aging to light buff to light orange. The stipe is 2.5–20 cm (1–7 3/4 in) long and 2–10 cm (3/4–4 in) thick. Its reddish-brown surface is made of small scales that are less dense in the upper half, where it has a more whitish or buff color.

The fruit bodies produce a white to buff spore print. Microscopically, the spores are somewhat spindle-shaped when viewed from the side, and elliptical viewed from the front; they measure 8–10.5 by 3–5.5 μm and are inamyloid. The basidia (spore-bearing cells) are thin-walled, club-shaped and four-spored, measuring 26–36 by 5–8.8 μm. The cystidia on both the faces and edges of the gills are thin-walled, hyaline (translucent), narrowly club-shaped, and measure 26–36 by 5–8.8 μm. The cap cuticle comprises threadlike hyphae with a diameter of 4.4–8 μm, while the cap flesh is made of interwoven hyphae (both thick- and thin-walled) measuring 2.5–6 μm. Clamp connections are present in the hyphae.

=== Similar species ===
The species resembles Neolentinus lepideus and Catathelasma imperiale. It can resemble Armillaria ponderosa, which grows on the ground.

== Habitat and distribution ==
Neolentinus ponderosus is a saprophytic species, and grows on the stumps and logs of conifers, particularly ponderosa pine. It causes a brown rot in wood, whereby it breaks down the hemicellulose and cellulose to cause a brown discoloration, and the subsequent cracking of the wood into roughly cubical pieces. Fruit bodies grow singly or in small clusters, and usually prefer open spots with direct sunlight. The range of the fungus is restricted to the Pacific Northwest region of western North America. Fruiting occurs in late spring, or later (summer) in mountainous locales.

== Uses ==
The young mushrooms are edible, but tend to become tough when mature. It can then be cooked longer or parboiled. The flesh has a fruit or indistinct odor and a mild taste. They are prized by the Rarámuri Indians of Mexico.
