= Gloeophyllum mexicanum =

Scientific classification
- Domain: Eukaryota
- Kingdom: Fungi
- Division: Basidiomycota
- Class: Agaricomycetes
- Order: Gloeophyllales
- Family: Gloeophyllaceae
- Genus: Gloeophyllum
- Species: G. mexicanum

Binomial name
- Gloeophyllum mexicanum (Mont.) Ryvarden, (1982)

Synonyms
- Cellularia endophaea (Pat.) Kuntze, (1898); Cellularia mexicana (Mont.) Kuntze, (1898); Daedalea rhabarbarina Berk. & Cooke, (1878); Lenzites endophaea Pat., (1889); Lenzites mexicana Mont., (1843); Lenzites saepiformi Lloyd, (1924)

Species of fungus

Gloeophyllum mexicanum is a plant pathogen.
