= Campylomyces =

Scientific classification
- Kingdom: Fungi
- Division: Basidiomycota
- Class: Agaricomycetes
- Order: Gloeophyllales
- Family: Gloeophyllaceae
- Genus: Campylomyces; Nakasone (2004)

Type species
- Campylomyces tabacinus (Cooke) Nakasone

Species
- C. heimii C. tabacinus

Genus of fungi

Campylomyces is a genus of wood-rotting fungi in the family Gloeophyllaceae. The genus, circumscribed by Karen K. Nakasone in 2004 to contain two species formerly assigned to Veluticeps, is characterized by producing small, thin, cup-shaped fruit bodies that grow in groups.
