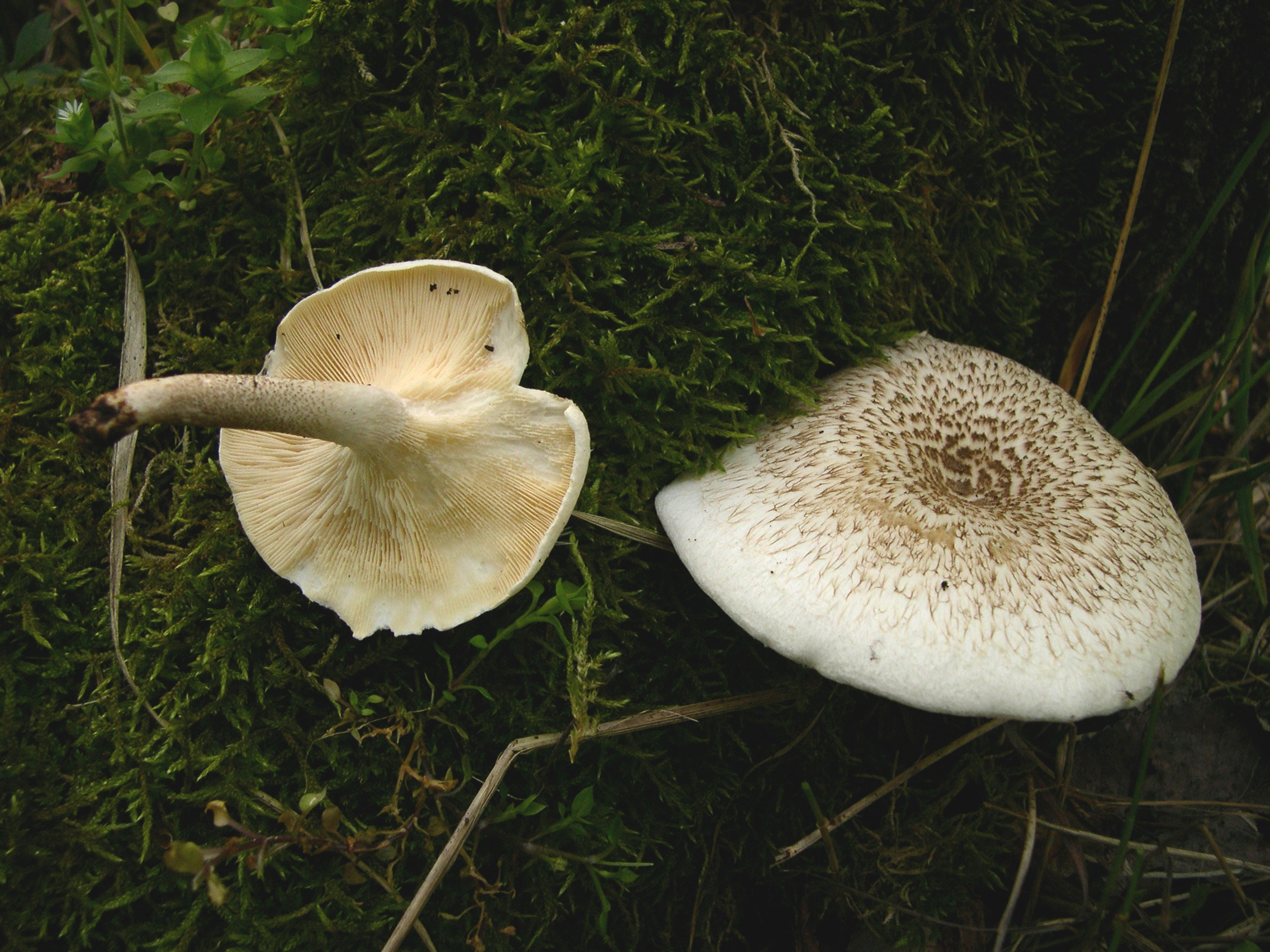

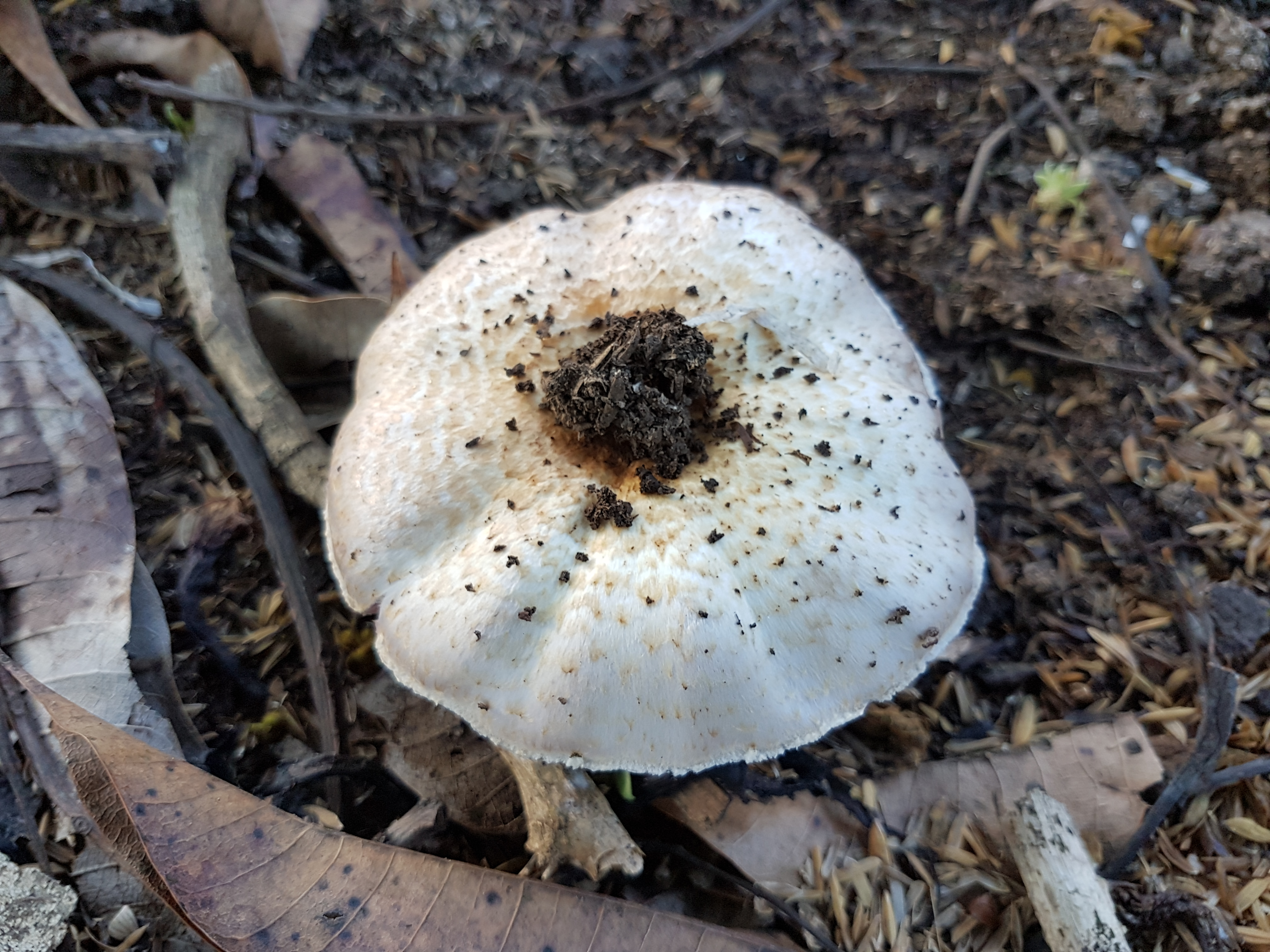

Scientific classification
- Kingdom: Fungi
- Division: Basidiomycota
- Class: Agaricomycetes
- Order: Polyporales
- Family: Polyporaceae
- Genus: Lentinus
- Species: L. tigrinus

Binomial name
- Lentinus tigrinus (Bull.) Fr. (1825)

Synonyms
- Agaricus tigrinus Bull. (1782); Omphalia tigrina (Bull.) Gray (1821); Clitocybe tigrina (Bull.) P. Kumm (1871); Pocillaria tigrina (Bull.) Kuntze (1891); Lentodium tigrinum (Bull.) Earle (1909); Panus tigrinus (Bull.) Singer (1951); Pleurotus tigrinus (Bull.) Kühner (1980); Polyporus gerdai D. Krüger (2004); Agaricus dunalii DC. (1815); Lentinus dunalii (DC.) Fr. (1825); Pocillaria dunalii (DC.) Kuntze (1891); Lentinus tigrinus var. dunalii (DC.) Rea (1922); Lentinus tigrinus var. dunalii (DC.) Romagn. ex Bon (1985) Agaricus denticulatus Schwein. (1822); Lentinus schweinitzii Fr. (1825); Lentinus contortus Fr. (1836); Lentinus ravenelii Berk. & M.A. Curtis (1849); Lentinus fimbriatus Curr. (1863); Pocillaria fimbriata (Curr.) Kuntze (1891); Lentodium squamulosum Morgan (1895); Panus tigrinus var. squamulosus (Morgan) Rosinski and Robinson. (1986); Lentinus ghattasensis Henn. (1898)

= Lentinus tigrinus =

Species of fungus

Lentinus tigrinus is a mushroom in the Polyporaceae family. It is classified as nonpoisonous. It has been reported that the mushrooms have significant antioxidant and antimicrobial activity.

The caps are 2–4 centimetres (3/4–1 1/2 in) wide. It produces a white spore print.
