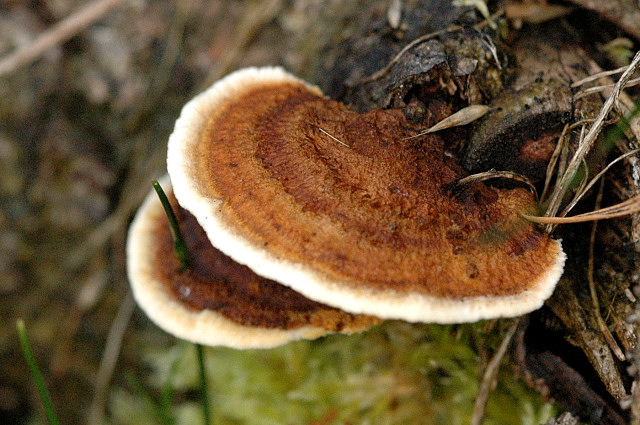
- Fruiting bodies of the rusty gilled polypore (Gloeophyllum sepiarium)

Scientific classification
- Kingdom: Fungi
- Division: Basidiomycota
- Class: Agaricomycetes
- Order: Gloeophyllales
- Family: Gloeophyllaceae
- Genus: Gloeophyllum; P. Karst. (1882)

Type species
- Gloeophyllum sepiarium (Wulfen) P. Karst. (1882) (as Gleophyllum)

Species
- G. abietinum G. carbonarium G. concentricum G. mexicanum G. odoratum G. protractum G. sepiarium G. striatum G. trabeum

= Gloeophyllum =

Genus of fungi

Gloeophyllum is a genus of fungus in the class Agaricomycetes. It is characterized by the production of leathery to corky tough, brown, shaggy-topped, revivable fruitbodies lacking a stipe and with a lamellate to daedaleoid or poroid fertile hymenial surfaces. The hyphal system is dimitic to trimitic. The genus is further characterized by the production of a brown rot of wood. Phylogenetically, it along with several other brown rot Basidiomycota, Neolentinus, Heliocybe, and Veluticeps form an order called the Gloeophyllales.

The most frequently encountered species in the Northern Hemisphere is Gloeophyllum sepiarium, which is commonly found in a dried state on both bark-covered and decorticated conifer stumps and logs, timbers on wharfs, planks on unpainted wooden buildings, wood bridges, and even creosoted railroad ties.

== Pharmacology ==
An extract of Gloeophyllum odoratum exhibits high inhibitory activity on thrombin and trypsin as well as cysteine protease.
