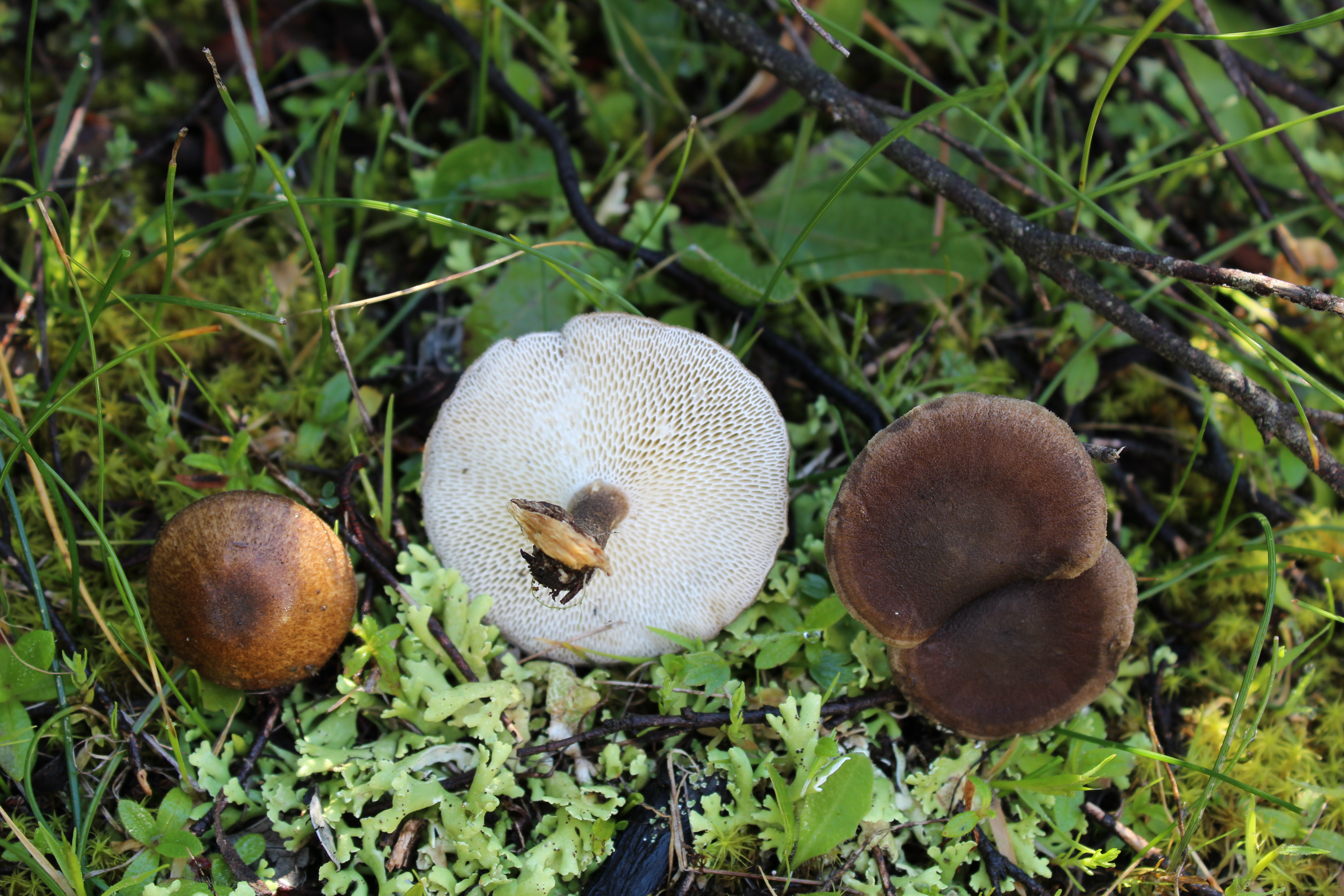

Scientific classification
- Domain: Eukaryota
- Kingdom: Fungi
- Division: Basidiomycota
- Class: Agaricomycetes
- Order: Polyporales
- Family: Polyporaceae
- Genus: Lentinus
- Species: L. meridionalis

Binomial name
- Lentinus meridionalis (A. David) Jargeat, Corriol & J.-P. Chaumeton (2023)

Synonyms
- Leucoporus meridionalis A.David (1973); Polyporus meridionalis (A.David) H.Jahn (1980); Cerioporus meridionalis (A.David) I.V.Zmitrovich & A.E.Kovalenko (2016)

= Lentinus meridionalis =

Species of fungus

Lentinus meridionalis is a species of fungus in the family Polyporaceae. First described in 1973 as a species of the now-defunct genus Leucoporus, it was first transferred to the genus Polyporus in 1980. In 2023, the species was moved to its present genus.
