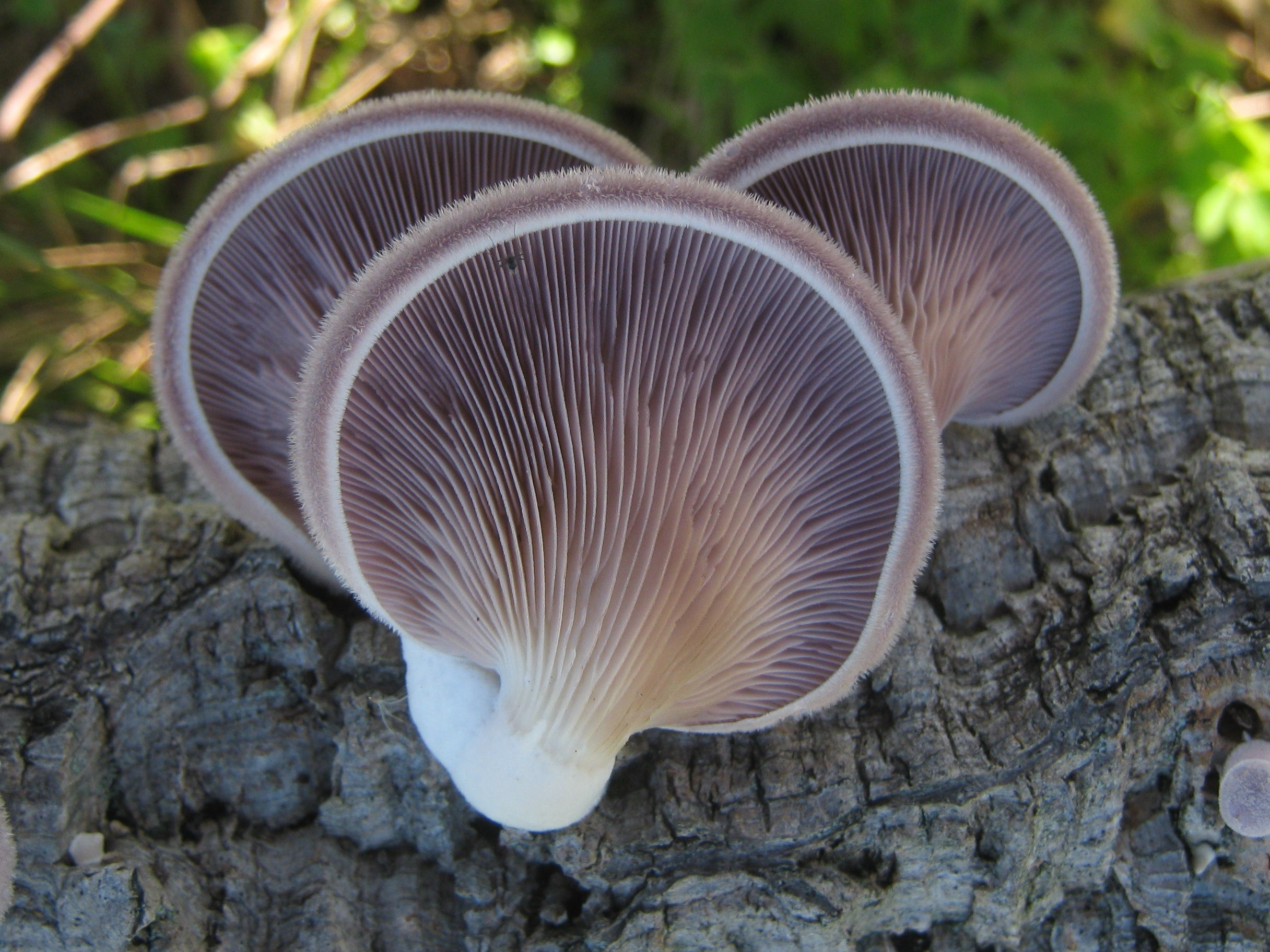

Scientific classification
- Kingdom: Fungi
- Division: Basidiomycota
- Class: Agaricomycetes
- Order: Polyporales
- Family: Polyporaceae
- Genus: Lentinus
- Species: L. strigosus

Binomial name
- Lentinus strigosus Fr. (1825)

Synonyms
- Agaricus crinitus Schwein. (1822); Agaricus strigosus Schwein. (1822); Lentinus lecomtei Fr. (1825); Agaricus strigopus Pers. (1827); Agaricus hirtus Secr. (1833); Lentinus strigopus (Pers.) Fr. (1836); Agaricus macrosporus Mont. (1837); Lentinus capronatus Fr. (1838); Lentinus strigosus Fr. (1838); Panus rudis Fr. (1838); Agaricus sainsonii Lév. (1842); Lentinus chaetophorus Lév. (1844); Panus lamyanus Mont. (1856); Panus hoffmannii Fr. (1865); Panus sainsonii (Lév.) Heufl. (1867); Lentinus sparsibarbis Berk. & M.A.Curtis (1868); Pleurotus macrosporus (Mont.) Sacc. (1887); Pocillaria chaetophora (Lév.) Kuntze (1891); Pocillaria sparsibarbis (Berk. & M.A.Curtis) Kuntze (1891); Pocillaria strigosa (Fr.) Kuntze (1891); Lentinus lamyanus (Mont.) Henn. (1898); Lentinus rudis (Fr.) Henn. (1898); Pocillaria lamyana (Mont.) Kuntze (1898); Pocillaria rudis (Fr.) Kuntze (1898); Lentinus substrigosus Henn. & Shirai (1900); Panus rudis f. sainsonii (Lév.) Malk. (1932); Pleurotus rudis (Fr.) Pilát (1935); Panus fragilis O.K.Mill. (1965)

= Lentinus strigosus =

Species of fungus

Lentinus strigosus
- Mycological characteristics
- Gills on hymenium
- Cap is offset
- Hymenium is free
- Stipe is bare
- Spore print is purple to purple-black
- Ecology is saprotrophic
- Edibility is edible

Lentinus strigosus is a species of fungus in the family Polyporaceae.

== Taxonomy ==
The species was first described by Lewis David de Schweinitz in 1822 as Agaricus strigosus in North Carolina.

== Description ==
The expanded cap is semi-vase-shaped with an inrolled edge, usually purple then fading to brownish. The flesh is white, thin, and tough. The gills are close, narrow, and cap-coloured then whitish. The stipe is short, lateral and hairy. The taste is often bitter. The spores are white and smooth.

=== Similar species ===
Phyllotopsis nidulans is similar, but is orange-yellow and has a poor odour.

== Distribution and habitat ==
It can be found in parts of North America and the Philippines.

== Uses ==
It is edible when young, but becomes very tough with age.

== See also ==
- Hexacyclinol
