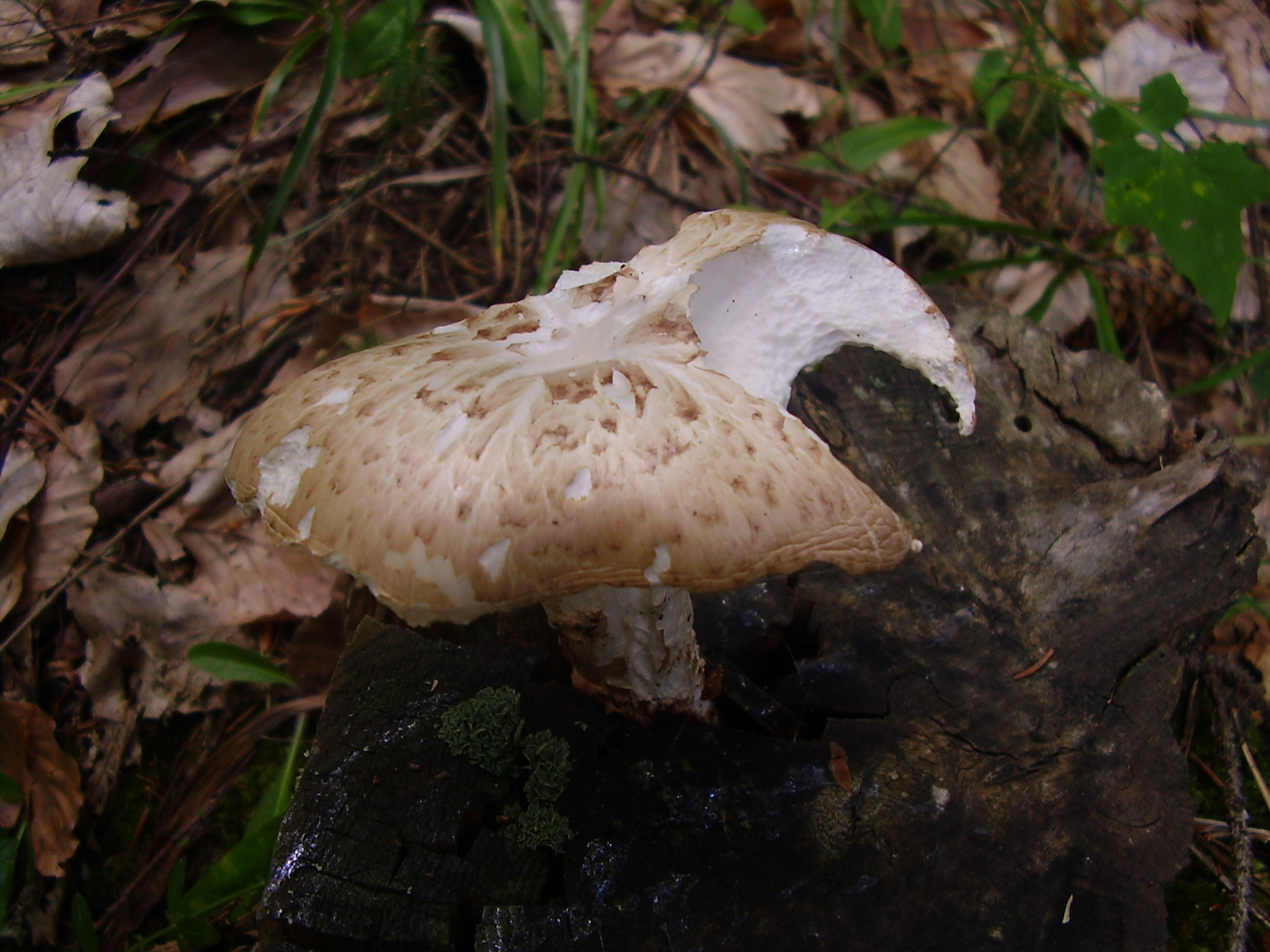
- Neolentinus lepideus

Scientific classification
- Domain: Eukaryota
- Kingdom: Fungi
- Division: Basidiomycota
- Class: Agaricomycetes
- Order: Gloeophyllales
- Family: Gloeophyllaceae
- Genus: Neolentinus; Redhead & Ginns (1985)

Type species
- Neolentinus kauffmanii (A.H.Sm.) Redhead & Ginns (1985)

Species
- N. adhaerens N. cirrhosus N. cyathiformis N. dactyloides N. kauffmanii N. lepideus N. pallidus N. papuanus N. ponderosus N. schaefferi

= Neolentinus =

Genus of fungi

Neolentinus is a genus of wood-decaying agarics with tough (leathery to woody) fruit bodies composed of dimitic tissue, serrated lamella edges, and nonamyloid white binucleate basidiospores among other features. It was segregated from Lentinus in the broad taxonomic sense, hence the derivation of the name. Biologically Neolentinus species produce a brown rot type of decay of wood, whereas Lentinus causes a white rot. Molecular phylogenetic analysis shows that the two genera are unrelated. Neolentinus is phylogenetically allied to other brown rot genera such as Gloeophyllum, Heliocybe, and Veluticeps. A new order, the Gloeophyllales, has been described for these fungi. Heliocybe had been placed in synonymy but it differs phylogenetically and anatomically by the lack of clamp connections that all Neolentinus produce on their generative hyphae.

== Species ==
The best known species in this genus is Neolentinus lepideus, sometimes known as the "train wrecker", a name coined because the fungus is one of the few decay fungi that can grow on creosote-treated railroad ties. Neolentinus lepideus also grows on timbers in old mines, but because it requires light to form its cap, the fungus forms bizarre growth forms when fruit bodies start to form in dark mine shafts or cellars. Neolentinus lepideus is widely distributed.

Neolentinus kauffmanii decays sitka spruce on the west coast of North America, producing a variation of brown rot called brown pocket rot. Neolentinus ponderosus is another western North American species found on the ground, growing from the roots of or growing from the stumps of pine, predominantly Pinus ponderosa in montane areas. In California, it is often solitary, common in the Sierra, and is rare at low elevations. The fruiting commences from late spring to late summer. Sought out when young and tender, it has an excellent taste.

Neolentinus dactyloides is a fire ecology species that fruits from massive subterranean pseudosclerotia in Australia.

== Etymology ==
Neolentinus means the new (Latin - neo-) Lentinus. Lentinus is an older generic name historically applied to a broad group of agarics, and now restricted in application excluding Neolentinus.
