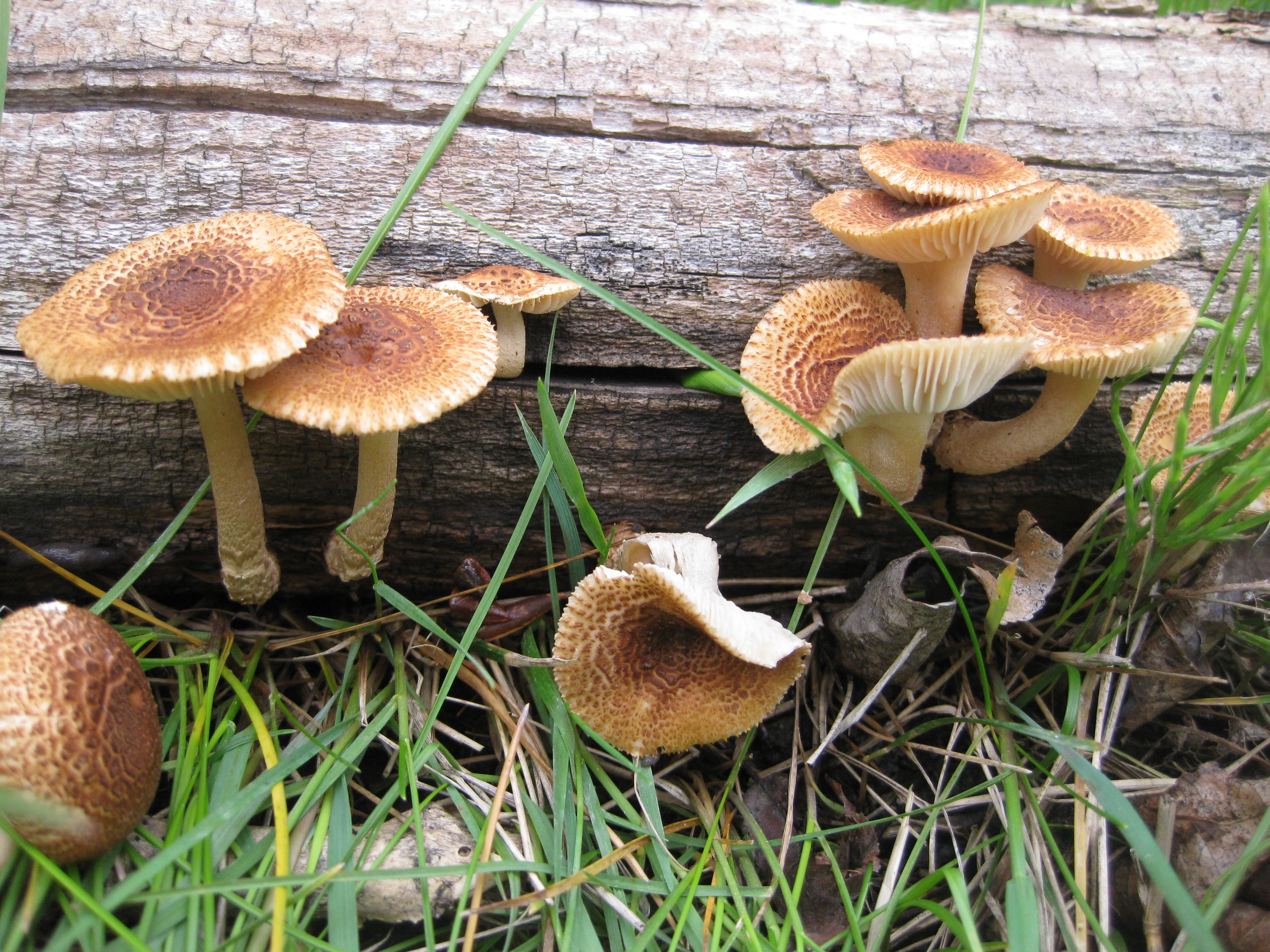

Scientific classification
- Domain: Eukaryota
- Kingdom: Fungi
- Division: Basidiomycota
- Class: Agaricomycetes
- Order: Gloeophyllales
- Family: Gloeophyllaceae
- Genus: Heliocybe; Redhead & Ginns (1985)
- Species: H. sulcata

Binomial name
- Heliocybe sulcata (Berk.) Redhead & Ginns (1985)

= Heliocybe =

Genus of fungi

Heliocybe is an agaric genus closely allied to Neolentinus and the bracket fungus, Gloeophyllum, all of which cause brown rot of wood. Heliocybe sulcata is the type and sole species.

== Description ==
Heliocybe sulcata is characterized by thumb-sized, tough, revivable, often dried, mushroom fruitbodies. The tanned symmetric cap (pileus) is up to 2 centimetres (3/4 in) across and radially cracked into a ray pattern of scales and ridges. The lamellae are cream-coloured, distant and serrated. The stipe is cylindrical, up to 2 cm tall and 4 mm wide, sometimes curved, and scaly towards the base, often enlarged.

Like Neolentinus, H. sulcata produces abundant, conspicuous pleurocystidia, but H. sulcata lacks clamp connections. Crinipellis zonata lacks the raised ridges along the margin.

== Taxonomy ==
In older classifications, H. sulcata was known as Lentinus sulcatus or Panus fulvidus. However, there is strong phylogenetic evidence for the segregation of a group of brown rot causing fungi at the level of order, including Neolentinus, Heliocybe and Gloeophyllum, from the Polyporales where Lentinus and Panus are classified. Heliocybe has also been placed into synonymy with Neolentinus, but anatomically they differ by the absence versus the presence of clamp connections and phylogenetically Heliocybe is distinct, being either a sister group to Neolentinus or to a Neolentinus-Gloeophyllum-clade, or allied to Gloeophyllum odoratum.

=== Etymology ===
Heliocybe derives from the Greek helios (= the sun) and cybe (=head), and means "the sun-head". It was coined in reference to its sun-like pattern on its pileus together with its affinity to sun-baked habitats.

== Habitat and distribution ==
Heliocybe sulcata typically fruits on decorticated, sun-dried and cracked wood, such as fence posts and rails, vineyard trellises in Europe, branches in slash areas, and semi-arid areas such on sagebrush or on naio branches in rain shadow areas of Hawaii, or in open pine forests.

In North America, it can be found in the Mountain states and as far east as Texas and Kansas from April to September.
