= Lentinus roseus =

Scientific classification
- Domain: Eukaryota
- Kingdom: Fungi
- Division: Basidiomycota
- Class: Agaricomycetes
- Order: Polyporales
- Family: Polyporaceae
- Genus: Lentinus
- Species: L. roseus

Binomial name
- Lentinus roseus Karun., K.D.Hyde & Zhu L.Yang (2011)

Species of fungus

Lentinus roseus is a species of edible mushroom in the family Polyporaceae, first found in northern Thailand.
