= Mycothele =

Scientific classification
- Kingdom: Fungi
- Division: Basidiomycota
- Class: Agaricomycetes
- Order: Gloeophyllales
- Family: Gloeophyllaceae
- Genus: Mycothele; Jülich (1976)

Type species
- Mycothele disciformis Jülich (1976)

Genus of fungi

Mycothele is a fungal genus in the family Gloeophyllaceae. Circumscribed by Swiss mycologist Walter Jülich in 1976, the genus is monotypic, containing the single species Mycothele disciformis.
