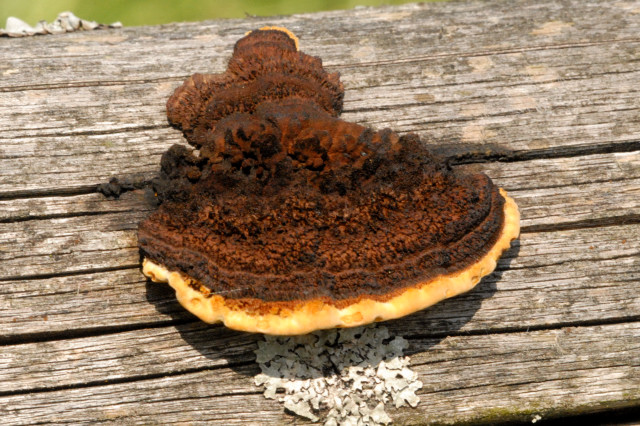

Scientific classification
- Kingdom: Fungi
- Division: Basidiomycota
- Class: Agaricomycetes
- Order: Gloeophyllales
- Family: Gloeophyllaceae
- Genus: Gloeophyllum
- Species: G. trabeum

Binomial name
- Gloeophyllum trabeum (Pers.) Murrill (1908)

Synonyms
- List: Agaricus trabeus Pers. (1801) Cellularia trabea; (Pers.) Kuntze (1898) Cellularia vialis; (Peck) Kuntze (1898) Chaetoporellus trabeus; (Rostk.) M.P.Christ. (1960) Coriolopsis trabea; (Pers.) Bondartsev & Singer (1941) Daedalea eatonii; Berk. [as 'eatoni'] (1876) Daedalea mutabilis; Quél. (1896) Daedalea poetschii; Schulzer (1879) Daedalea reisneri; Velen. (1922) Daedalea trabea; (Pers.) Fr. (1821) Lenzites clelandii; Lloyd (1919) Lenzites roburnea; Velen. (1930) Lenzites sepiaria var. pini; Velen. (1922) Lenzites trabea; (Pers.) Fr. (1838) Lenzites trabeus; (Pers.) Bres. (1897) Lenzites vialis; Peck (1874) Leptoporus lacteus f. trabeus; (Rostk.) Pilát (1938) Leptoporus testaceus; (Fr.) Bourdot & Galzin (1925) Leptoporus trabeus; (Pers.) Bourdot & Galzin (1925) Leptoporus trabeus; (Rostk.) Quél. (1886) Phaeocoriolellus trabeus; (Pers.) Kotl. & Pouzar (1957) Phaeocoriolellus trabeus f. vialis; (Peck) Domanski (1967) Polyporus trabeus; (Pers.) Rostk. (1830) Poria rensii; Bres. (1926) Striglia poetschii; (Schulzer) Kuntze (1891) Trametes sordida; Speg. (1898) Trametes trabea; G.H.Otth (1871) Trametes trabea; (Pers.) Bres. (1897) Tyromyces trabeus; (Rostk.) Parmasto (1959)

= Gloeophyllum trabeum =

Species of fungus

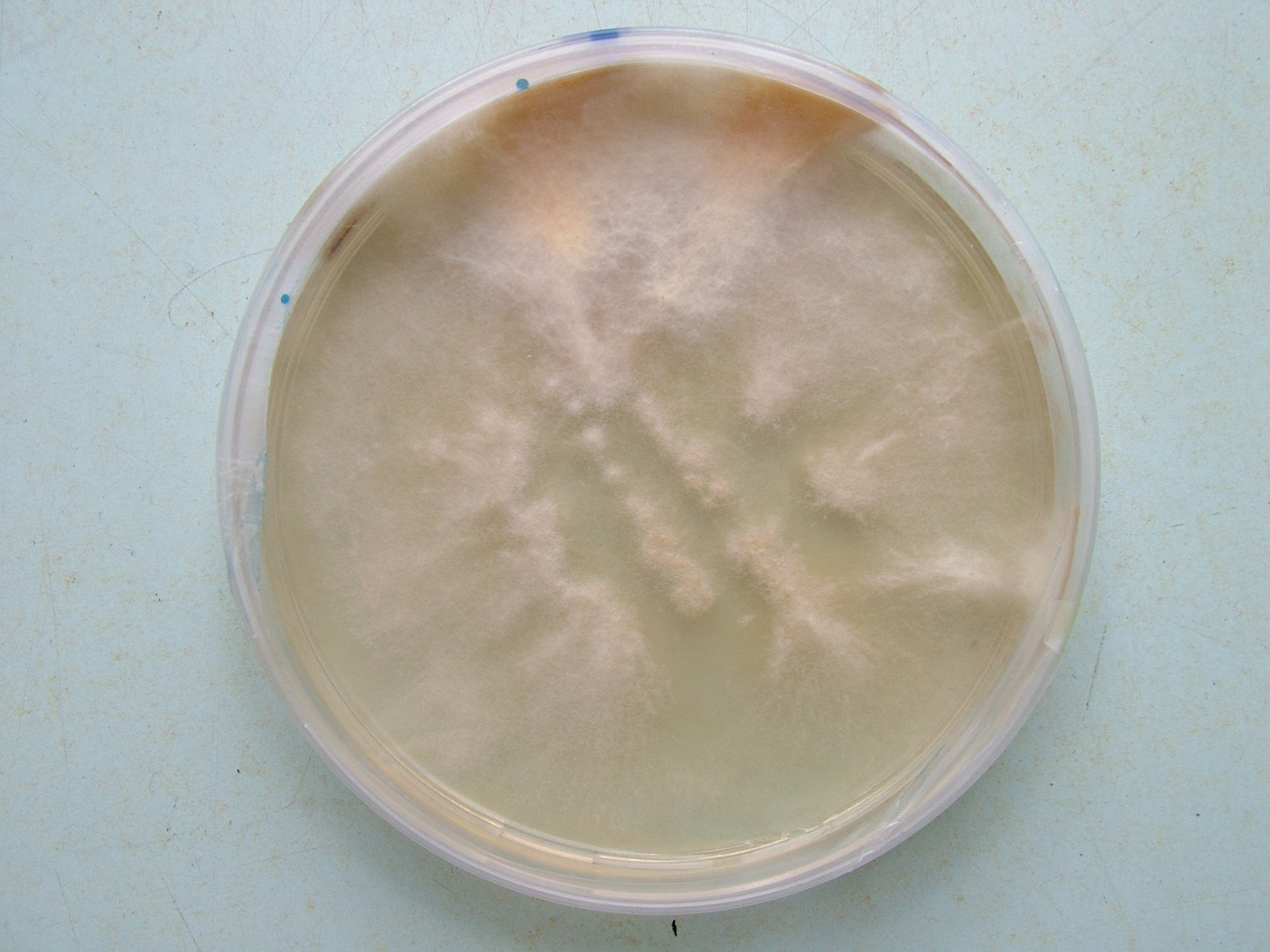
Culture of Gloeophyllum trabeum mycelium

Gloeophyllum trabeum is a species of fungus in the family Gloeophyllaceae.
