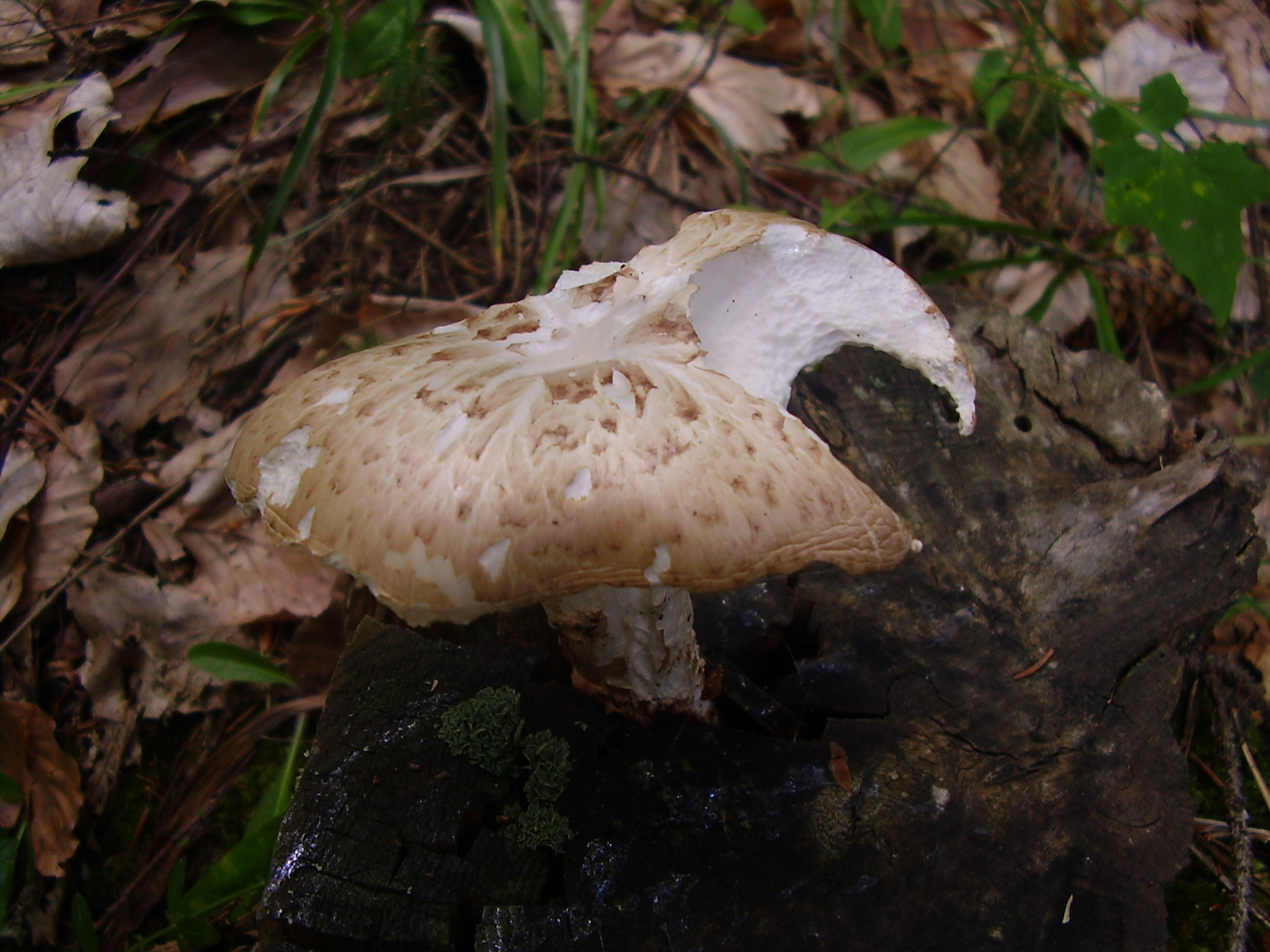

Scientific classification
- Kingdom: Fungi
- Division: Basidiomycota
- Class: Agaricomycetes
- Order: Gloeophyllales
- Family: Gloeophyllaceae
- Genus: Neolentinus
- Species: N. lepideus

Binomial name
- Neolentinus lepideus (Fr.) Redhead & Ginns (1985)

= Neolentinus lepideus =

Neolentinus lepideus
- Mycological characteristics
- Gills on hymenium
- Cap is convex or flat
- Hymenium is adnate or decurrent
- Stipe has a ring
- Spore print is white
- Ecology is saprotrophic
- Edibility is edible

Neolentinus lepideus is a basidiomycete mushroom of the genus Neolentinus, until recently also widely known as Lentinus lepideus. Common names for it include scaly sawgill, scaly lentinus and train wrecker.

== Description ==
Neolentinus lepideus fruit bodies are tough, fleshy, agarics of variable size. The cap is at first convex and flattens with maturity while the margin remains enrolled. The cap may grow up to about 13 centimetres (5 in), while the stem grows to 12 cm (4 3/4 in) in height. The white, cream to pale-brown cap cuticle is distinctively covered with concentrically arranged dark scales which become denser towards the depressed cap centre.

The gills are white and their attachment to the stem is adnate to subdecurrent or decurrent. The gills and stipe can become dark reddish with age. The white stem is covered in dark scales in the region below the white ring. The odor is somewhat like anise, and the taste is indiscernible. The flesh is tough, increasingly so with maturity.

The spore print is white and the spores are cylindrical in shape. The spore dimensions are 8–12.5 by 3.5–5 μm.

=== Similar species ===
Neolentinus ponderosus is similar but has no partial veil, and thus no ring. Pleurotus levis grows on hardwoods, with a more fuzzy cap lacking scales.

== Habitat and distribution ==
The fruiting bodies of Neolentinus lepideus are found singly or in tufts emerging from dead and decaying coniferous wood, favouring pines (Pinus) including old stumps, logs, and timber. It may also be found in gardens, on man-made wooden structures such as old railroad ties, and in such unusual places as coal mines. Less frequently, it is also found on non-coniferous hardwood. Its fruiting season is spring to autumn and it is common in Europe and North America. In the latter, it appears from May to November (slightly shorter in the west). There have also been multiple reports of its occurrence in the Western Cape, South Africa.

== Ecology ==
Neolentinus lepideus has a saprotrophic mode of nutrition and is an important woodland decomposer and a cause of wet rot in building materials. The fungus has shown tolerance of wood treated with creosote and other preservatives, and has been used in experiments to evaluate the efficacy of treatment methods.

This species has been recorded as occasional food of adults of the pleasing fungus beetle Dacne quadrimaculata.

== Edibility ==
Some authors consider the species edible, especially when young, but it requires cooking to soften. While there have been no recorded poisonings, the fungus may come in contact with hazardous chemicals because its fruiting bodies tend to grow on human-made wooden structures, such as wooden railroad ties smeared with creosote.
