= Boreostereum =

Scientific classification
- Kingdom: Fungi
- Division: Basidiomycota
- Class: Agaricomycetes
- Order: Gloeophyllales
- Family: Gloeophyllaceae
- Genus: Boreostereum; Parmasto (1968)

Type species
- Boreostereum radiatum (Peck) Parmasto (1968)

Species
- B. borbonicum B. radiatum B. sulphuratum B. vibrans

Genus of fungi

Boreostereum is a genus of corticioid fungi. The genus was circumscribed in 1968 by Erast Parmasto to contain the type species, which was formerly known as Stereum radiatum. Boreostereum has four species that are widely distributed in northern temperate areas. Species in the genus have a dimitic hyphal system, and the hyphae have with brown encrustations that turn greenish when potassium hydroxide is applied. Boreosterum vibrans produces vibralactones, chemical metabolites that inhibit various enzymes. Recent phylogenetic research indicates that Boreostereum is a sister group to the rest of the Gloeophyllales.
