= Veluticeps =

Scientific classification
- Kingdom: Fungi
- Division: Basidiomycota
- Class: Agaricomycetes
- Order: Gloeophyllales
- Family: Gloeophyllaceae
- Genus: Veluticeps

Species
- V. berkeleyi

Genus of fungi

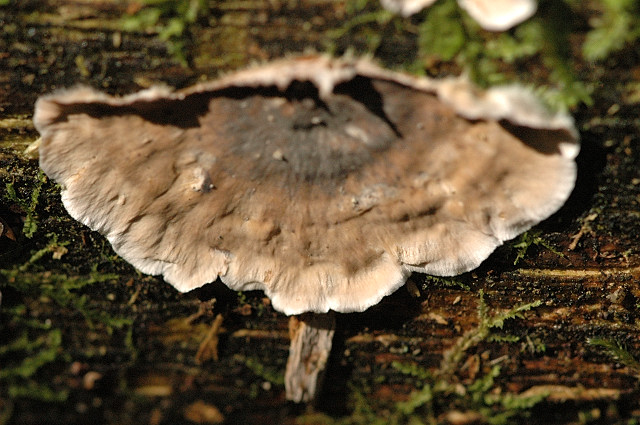
Veluticeps abietina from Commanster, Belgium

Veluticeps is a small genus of wood-rot fungi characterized by the production of resupinate to bracket shaped, perennial, tough, brown fruitbodies, that blacken when KOH solution is applied, and with a smooth to warted or cracked fertile undersurface. They cause a brown rot of wood. Cystidia in the hymenium are characteristically mostly in fascicles. The genus may be monotypic if Columnocystis is excluded. Phylogenetically, the type species, V. berkeleyi, groups with several other brown rot genera such as Neolentinus, Heliocybe, and Gloeophyllum.

== Etymology ==
The name Veluticeps was an elevation of the former species epithet "veluticeps" for the type species which was renamed, V. berkeleyi. Tautonyms, such as "Veluticeps veluticeps" would be illegitimate under the International Code of Botanical Nomenclature. The name combines velutum or velutinus, meaning "velvety" with -ceps meaning "head", combined to mean "velvety head", a reference to its velvety hymenium, rather than the actual upper surface (when it actually has a reflexed or bracket shape, which it does not always have).
