= Lentinus concentricus =

Scientific classification
- Domain: Eukaryota
- Kingdom: Fungi
- Division: Basidiomycota
- Class: Agaricomycetes
- Order: Polyporales
- Family: Polyporaceae
- Genus: Lentinus
- Species: L. concentricus

Binomial name
- Lentinus concentricus Karun., K.D.Hyde & Zhu L.Yang (2011)

Species of fungus

Lentinus concentricus is a species of edible mushroom in the family Polyporaceae, first found in northern Thailand and described as new to science in 2011.
