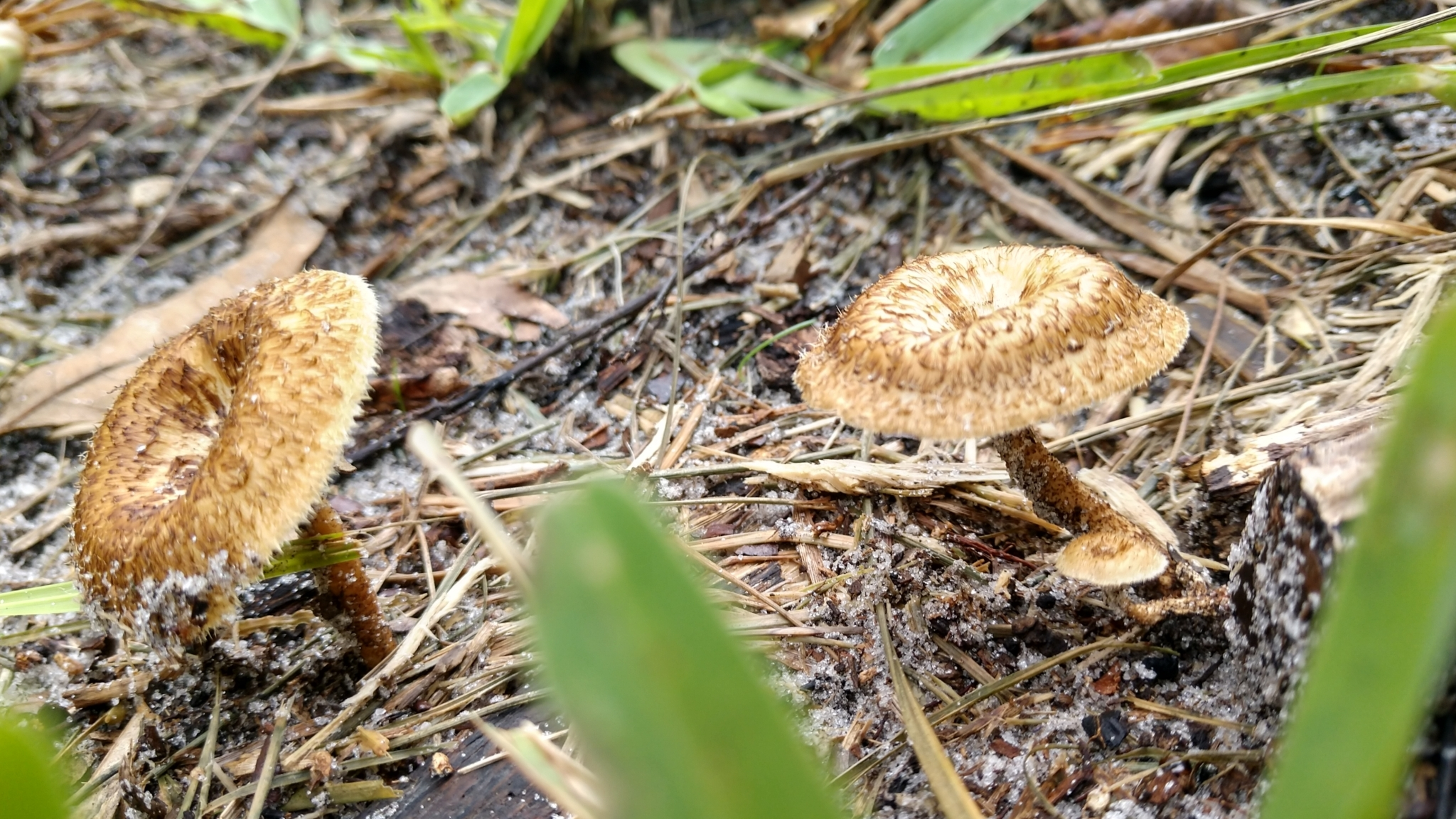

Scientific classification
- Kingdom: Fungi
- Division: Basidiomycota
- Class: Agaricomycetes
- Order: Polyporales
- Family: Polyporaceae
- Genus: Lentinus
- Species: L. crinitus

Binomial name
- Lentinus crinitus (L.) Fr. (1825)

Synonyms
- Agaricus crinitus L. (1763); Agaricus essequeboensis G. Mey. (1818); Lentinus chaetoloma Fr. (1851); Agaricus crinitus var. crinitus L. Fr. (1825); Lentinus essequeboensis G. Mey. Fr. (1825); Panus crinitus (L.) Singer (1951); Panus wrightii Berk. & M. A. Curtis (1868); Pocillaria chaetoloma Fr. Kuntze (1891); Polyporus phyllostipes D. Kruger (2004)

= Lentinus crinitus =

Species of fungus

Lentinus crinitus, the fringed sawgill, is a basidiomycete species of fungus.

== Taxonomy ==
It is in the subdivision Agaricomycotina, the order Polyporales and in the family Polyporaceae, within the group Polyporellus. There are many synonyms including Agaricus essequeboensis, Lentinus chaetoloma, L. essequeboensis, L. microloma, L. rigidulus, L. subcervinus, Curtis, L. wrightii, Panus crinitus, Panus wrightii, Polyporus phyllostipes, and Agaricus crinitus.

This fungus was first described by Carl Linnaeus, and reported and identified by Elias Magnus Fries in 1825.

The closest relative is to L. crinitus is Lentinus swartzii and the closest genus is Polyporus with Ganoderma being closely related as well.

It has been included in multiple phylogenetic studies.

Lentinus crinitus appears to form a single mating group. In fungi, a single mating group means that a species has one mating type, or that it is homothallic. This means that the species can mate with itself, or reproduce asexually.

== Description ==
The fruiting bodies commonly grow in irregular, clustered formations. The cap is 2–5 centimetres (3/4–2 in) wide and ranges in shape from flat or slightly convex to depressed in the center or funnel-shaped (infundibuliform). Its surface is whitish when young, maturing to yellowish-brown. It is covered with a brownish scruff which can wear away. The margin is often rolled inward when young and flattens with age.

The stipe can be 2–4.5 cm long and 2–6 mm thick, usually having a small bulb at the base. The stipe is not hollow, has a somewhat roughened surface and a leathery feel. The stipe is lighter in color than the cap but the same color profile. The gills extend slightly down the stem (decurrent), are narrow, somewhat forked, and finely toothed (denticulate), with a glandular surface. They appear in shades from pale to dark fuscous, sometimes featuring yellowish-brown hairs along the edges. The stipe, measuring 1–4.5 cm long, can be central or off-center (eccentric) in relation to the cap, cylindrical, and leathery in texture, with a covering of light yellow scaly hairs (squamulose) and darker scales (squamules).

The basidiospores are white in and usually range between 5.5 and 8.0 × 1.8–3.0. The spores are rounded but may have a subtle point on one end that is off center and pointing right or left. The spores are not textured/smooth. These spores do not react with Meltzer's reagent. The spore print is white.

L. crinitus has a monomitic hyphae system with clamp connections. This fungi has generative hyphae and skeleton-ligators which differs from skeletal hyphae. Skeletal hyphae are generally thick-walled, non-septate and unbranched or sparsely branched while skeletal-ligators are highly branched and more flexible but still provide more structure and rigidity than generative hyphae alone. Skeletal-ligative hyphae help with connecting and binding other hyphal types, contributing to both strength and flexibility.

== Habitat and distribution ==
Lentinus crinitus is a white rot fungus; it is saprotrophic and is able to break down lignin and cellulose and use it for energy. It can be found on decaying logs in open areas, in tropical forest and in mixed oak-dominated forest. Known hosts of L. crinitus include dead wood from Nerium oleander, Hevea spp., Hippomane spp., Quercus spp., Barringtonia spp., Nyssa spp., Salix spp., Rhizophora mangle.

Lentinus crinitus is distributed across 27 countries. In South America, it can be found in Brazil, Colombia, Peru, Ecuador, Venezuela, French Guiana, Guyana, and Argentina. In North America, it occurs in the United States and Mexico. Its range in Central America includes the Dominican Republic, Belize, Costa Rica, Bahamas, Jamaica, Cuba, Haiti, Martinique, Guatemala, Panama, Honduras, Nicaragua, Trinidad and Tobago, and the Cayman Islands. It is also found in Africa, specifically in the Congo and Ethiopia, as well as in Asia, in the Philippines. They are typically found at an altitude of 50–2,800 metres (160–9,190 ft) above sea level, though there have been many observations of this species from Florida.

It is most often found in April to July in the Northern Hemisphere, and from September to December in the Southern Hemisphere. This means that this fungi is best suited to warmer and wetter climates so it is found in the summer months during the rainy season.

== Ecology ==
It is known to be a potential host of the parasitic fungus Hypomyces aurantius (Pers.) Fuckel 1870, Hypomyces aurantius is known to parasitize many species in the family Polyporaceae.

There are potential interactions with animals which may be attracted to the mushroom for food. Squirrels have been seen to eat this fungi.

Some have reported insects using it for food and habitat.

== Uses ==
=== Culinary ===
Many indigenous communities have utilized L. crinitus in their diets. The Amazonian communities of the Yanomami and Txicó in Brazil, the Uitoto, Muinane, and Andoke (Caquetá) in Colombia, the rural Loreto in Peru, and the Hotï in Venezuela use mushrooms, including Lentinus crinitus, as a staple food. The indigenous Uitoto people of Colombia use L.crinitus while they are young since adult specimens are tough and leathery and therefore are unpleasant. They eat it roasted on yarumo leaves and in broth. It is reportedly used as a postpartum strength-boosting medication in Mexico.

The species can be cultivated in various substrates that yield differing nutritional values.

It comprises 3.4% mineral matter, 26% crude fiber, and 1.5% ether extract. Compared to many edible mushrooms that are sold commercially, this fungus has a higher fiber content. Its protein levels are correlated with its nitrogen concentration, which is 2.24%. Significant amounts of other minerals are also found, including calcium (0.53%), phosphorus (0.19%), potassium (0.50%), magnesium (0.10%), and sulfur (0.18%). Copper is at 10 ppm, manganese is at 28 ppm, zinc is at 31 ppm, cobalt is at 0.11 ppm, sodium is at 109 ppm, and molybdenum is at 0.5 ppm. Wild specimens of L. crinitus presented content of 14.42% protein which is similar to other commercial mushrooms. Lentinus citrinus cultivated on cupuaçu exocarp (Theobroma grandiflorum) mixed with litter (CE + LI) can have up to 27% protein. 27% protein is very high for commercial and this is especially important for those trying to build and retain muscle on a vegan diet.

The ability of the L. crinitus mycelium to convert agricultural waste to substrate with high protein, fiber, and nitrogen content may make it suitable for use as a beneficial soil amendment or as animal feed.

Lentinus crinitus basidiocarp pileus and stipe have high antioxidant activity due to high amounts of antioxidant compounds such as malic acid, p-hydroxybenzoic acids and β-tocopherol. The buildup of reactive oxygen species(free radicals) in the body causes oxidative stress, which seems to be linked to a number of clinical conditions, including aging, cancer, cardiovascular disease, and neurological illnesses, antioxidant compounds may provide relief to that but research is still limited and inconclusive.

The pileus has a high concentration of protein, ash, tocopherols, and organic acids, particularly malic and oxalic acids. The stipe contains a lot of carbohydrates, energy, soluble sugars, and phenolic acids, primarily p-hydroxybenzoic acid. Trehalose is the major soluble sugar found in the basidiocarp pileus and stipe.

=== Other uses ===
Polysaccharides extracted from L. crinitus basidiocarps shown antiproliferative action in breast carcinoma cells . After treatment, these polysaccharides may activate J774 macrophages, as evidenced by an increase in the production of tumor necrosis factor alpha (TNFα) and nitric acid, which induces tumor cell death. These chemicals may improve anticancer activity.

The majority of the chemicals found in L. crinitus are documented for the first time in the genus. These studies demonstrated that the fungus produces a variety of physiologically active secondary metabolites. The findings discovered extracts included phytochemical 1,13,4-di-O-Caffeoylquinic which was shown to have potential for inhibiting the Zika virus.

L. crinitus can be used as a biological control against plant pathogenic fungi and bacteria since it has shown antimicrobial activity against 11 species of microorganisms, with greater activity against Aspergillus niger (spores), Aspergillus flavus (spores), and Mucor rouxii (spores)

It has potential to fight foodborne illness and food spoilage because extracts 1-desoxyhypnophylline (1) and 6,7-epoxy-4(15)-hirsuteno-5-ol (3), from the basidiocarp of L. crinitus basidiocarp showed antimicrobial activity against bacteria such as Escherichia coli, Listeria monocytogenes, Micrococcus luteus, P. aeruginosa, Staphylococcus aureus, Salmonella enterica, Bacillus cereus, and Enterobacter cloacae; and fungi such as Aspergillus fumigatus, A. niger, A. versicolor, Penecillium. ochrochloron, Talaromyces funiculosus, and T. virens, and two fungal food isolates A. ochraceus and Penicillium aurantiogriseum.

Potential to be cultivated in active agroforestry plantations as another source of income. Cultivation of this fungi provides nutritional alternatives in a growing world that has an increasing demand for food sources.
