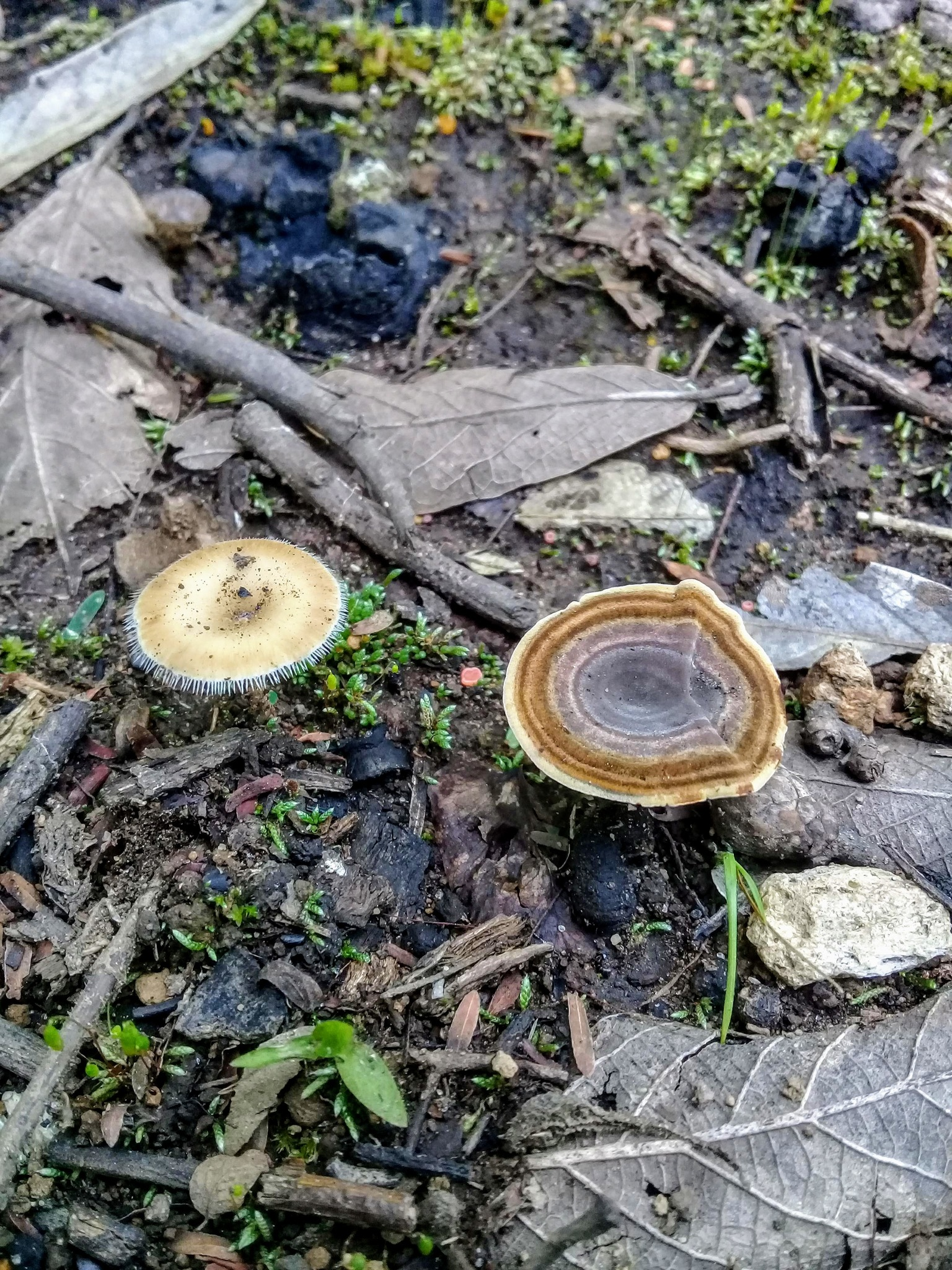

Scientific classification
- Kingdom: Fungi
- Division: Basidiomycota
- Class: Agaricomycetes
- Order: Polyporales
- Family: Polyporaceae
- Genus: Lentinus
- Species: L. flexipes

Binomial name
- Lentinus flexipes (Fr.) Zmitr. & Kovalenko

= Lentinus flexipes =

Species of fungus

Lentinus flexipes is a species of fungus belonging to the family Polyporaceae.
