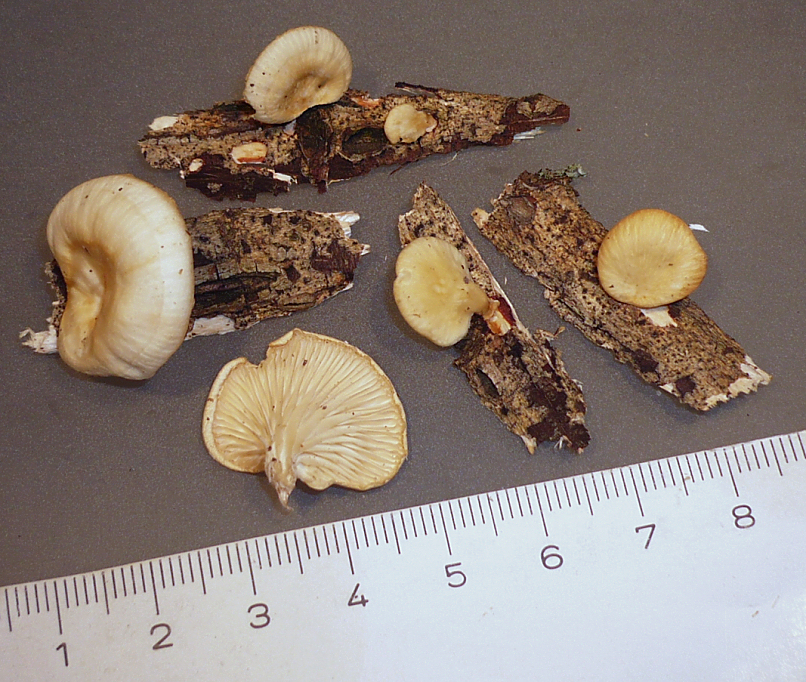

Scientific classification
- Kingdom: Fungi
- Division: Basidiomycota
- Class: Agaricomycetes
- Order: Polyporales
- Family: Polyporaceae
- Genus: Neofavolus
- Species: N. suavissimus

Binomial name
- Neofavolus suavissimus (Fries) J.S. Seelan, Justo & Hibbett, 2016

= Neofavolus suavissimus =

Species of fungus

Neofavolus suavissimus is a species of fungus belonging to the family Polyporaceae.

Synonym:

- Panus suavissimus (Fr.) Singer, 1951
