= Hexacyclinol =

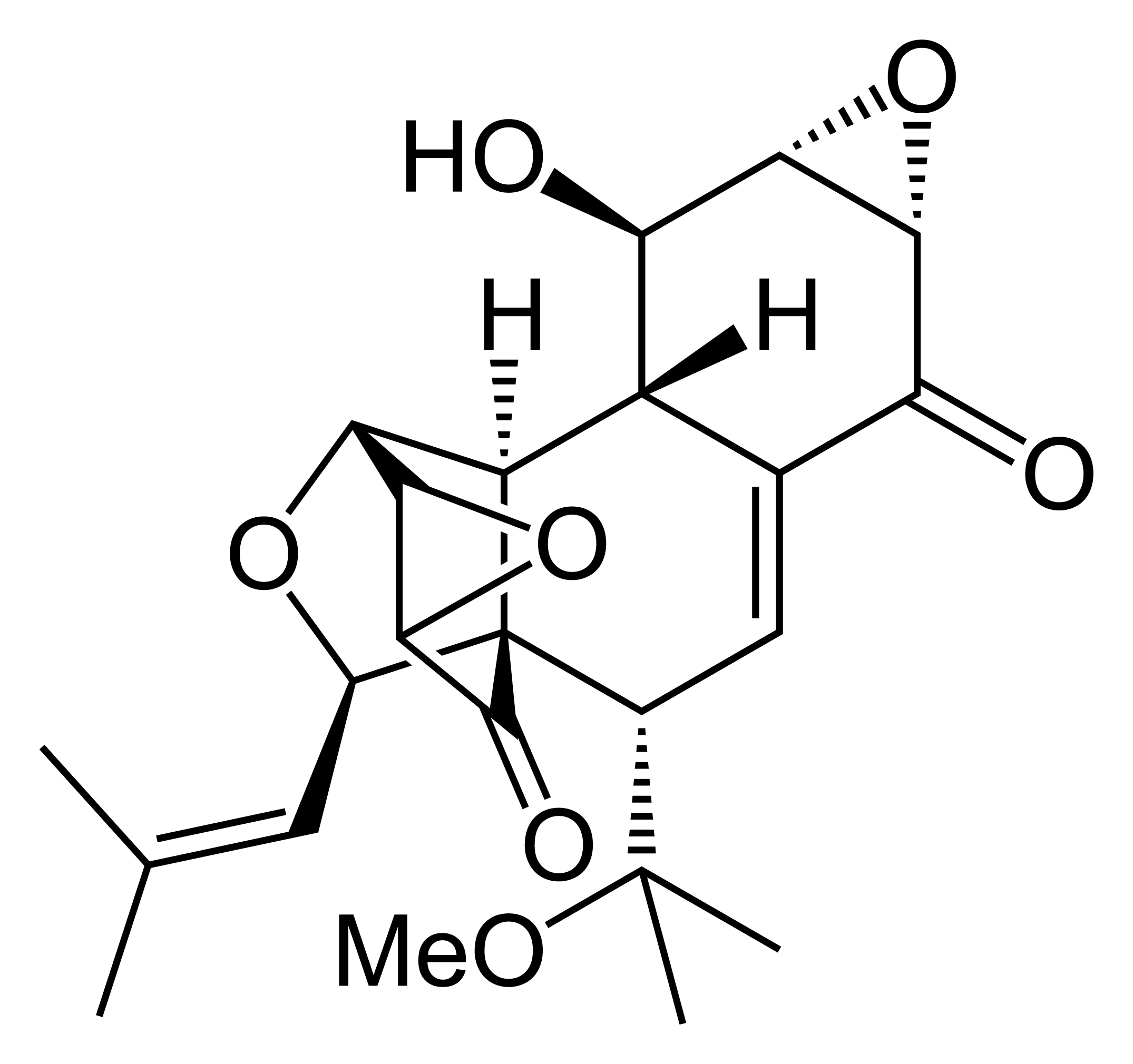
- (1) The structure for hexacyclinol proposed by Rychnovsky and synthesized by Porco, Jr.

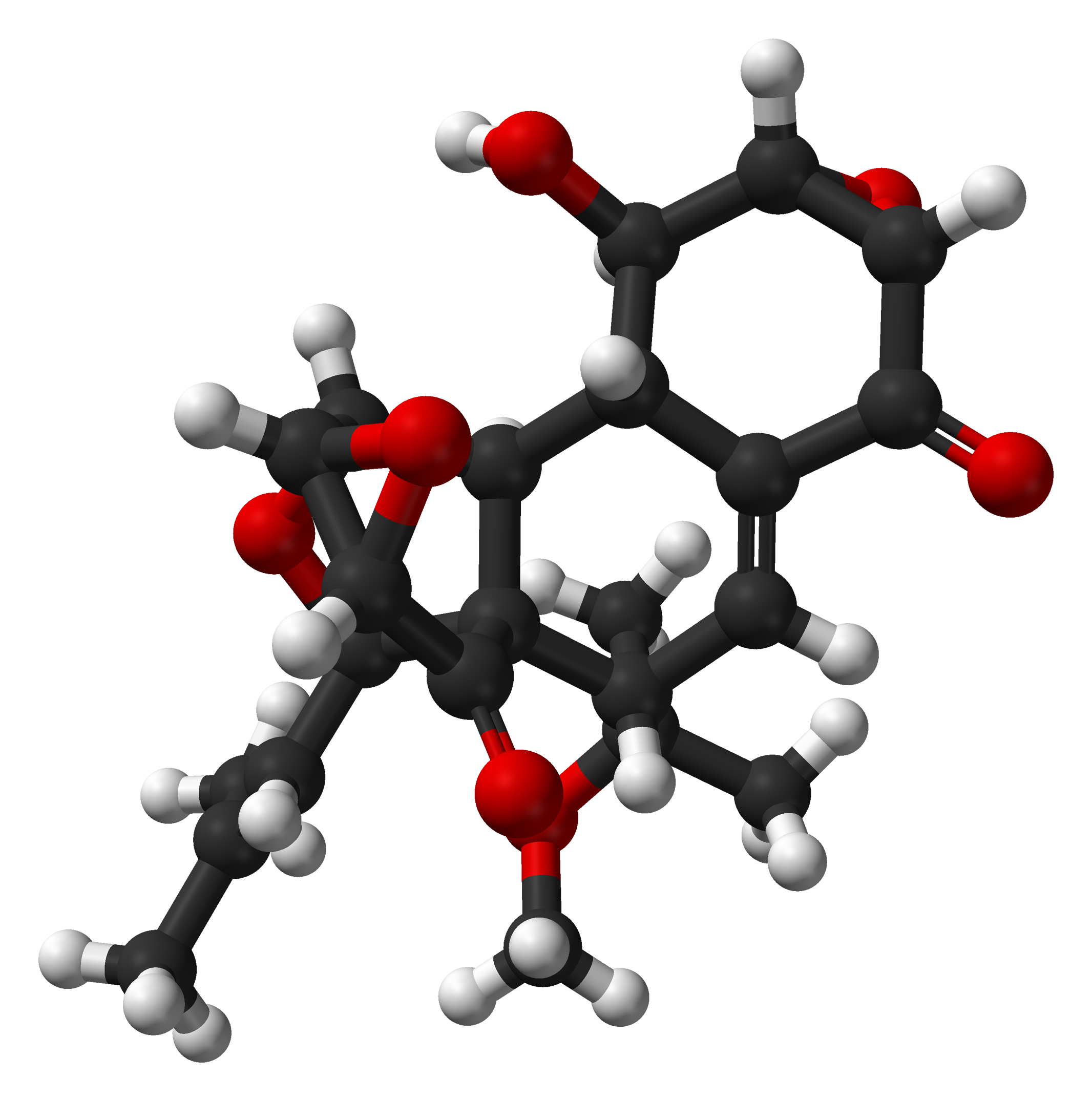

Names
- IUPAC name (2aS,3R,5aR,6aS,7R,8R,8aS,10R)-7-hydroxy-3-(1-methoxy-1-methylethyl)-10-(2-methylprop-1-en-1-yl)-1a,5a,6a,7,7a,7b,8,8a-octahydro-2H-8,2a-(epoxymethano)phenanthro[2,3-b:6,7-b']bisoxirene-2,5(3H)-dione

Identifiers
CAS Number	903574-41-4
3D model (JSmol)	Interactive image
ChemSpider	10148727
MeSH	C469535
PubChem CID	11975375
UNII	UG4YWN1CPX
CompTox Dashboard (EPA)	DTXSID101029628
- InChI: InChI=1S/C23H28O7/c1-8(2)6-11-23-10(22(3,4)27-5)7-9-12(15(25)18-17(29-18)14(9)24)13(23)16(28-11)19-20(30-19)21(23)26/h6-7,10-13,15-20,25H,1-5H3/t10-,11-,12-,13-,15-,16-,17-,18+,19+,20+,23+/m1/s1 Key: PFZFRWWDGXFULQ-NHFKQXEKSA-N
- SMILES: O=C5[C@]34[C@H](\C=C2\C(=O)[C@H]1O[C@H]1[C@H](O)[C@H]2[C@@H]3[C@@H](O[C@@H]4\C=C(/C)C)[C@@H]6O[C@H]56)C(OC)(C)C

Properties
Chemical formula	C_{23}H_{28}O_{7}
Molar mass	416.470 g·mol^{−1}
- Except where otherwise noted, data are given for materials in their standard state (at 25 °C [77 °F], 100 kPa). verify (what is ?) Infobox references

Hexacyclinol is a natural metabolite of a fungus, Panus rudis. Significant controversy surrounded its proposed structure until its total synthesis by John Porco, Jr. in 2006.

== Controversy over structure ==
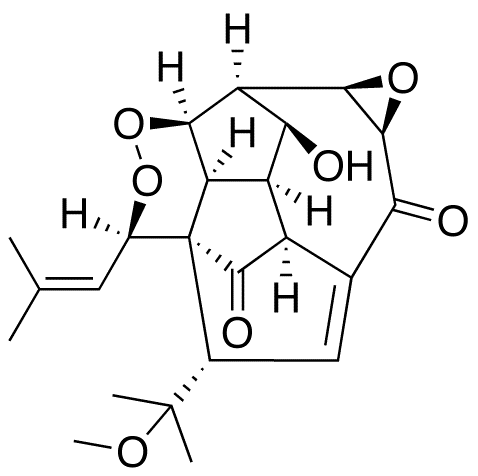
(2) The structure of hexacyclinol proposed by Gräfe and purportedly synthesized by La Clair.

Natural products chemist Udo Gräfe collected a sample of P. rudis HKI 0254 from a dead log in Siberia from which hexacyclinol was isolated. His group's 2002 paper showed that the compound behaved as an antiproliferative drug against cancer cell lines and proposed a structure (2) for the compound.

An initial total synthesis was published by James J. La Clair in 2006, purporting a synthesis of Gräfe's proposed structure based on ^{1}H nuclear magnetic resonance (NMR) spectra. Natural products chemist Scott D. Rychnovsky simulated the ^{13}C nuclear magnetic resonance spectrum of the structure proposed by Gräfe and found that it did not correspond to the spectrum of the structure allegedly synthesized by La Clair. Rychnovsky proposed a different structure (1) based on panepophenanthrin, another molecule isolated from a different strain of P. rudis. The scientific community then began criticizing La Clair's work, claiming that his work was sloppy or that he fabricated data. La Clair's publication of his purported synthesis was retracted in 2012, citing a lack of validation of its claims.

In 2006, a group led by John Porco, Jr. synthesized Rychnovsky's proposed structure. They showed that the ^{1}H- and ^{13}C-NMR spectra matched that of the compound isolated by Gräfe, confirming Rychnovsky's structure. La Clair claimed that since the two structures were isomers, it is possible that they would have similar ^{1}H-NMR spectra. However, a later paper by Saielli and Bagno claims that there would be significant differences in the ^{1}H- and ^{13}C-NMR spectra of compounds (1) and (2).

The controversy was covered extensively by a number of science blogs.

In response to the controversy, Nobel Prize-winning synthetic chemist E.J. Corey remarked, "Occasionally, blatantly wrong science is published, and to the credit of synthetic chemistry, the corrections usually come quickly and cleanly."
