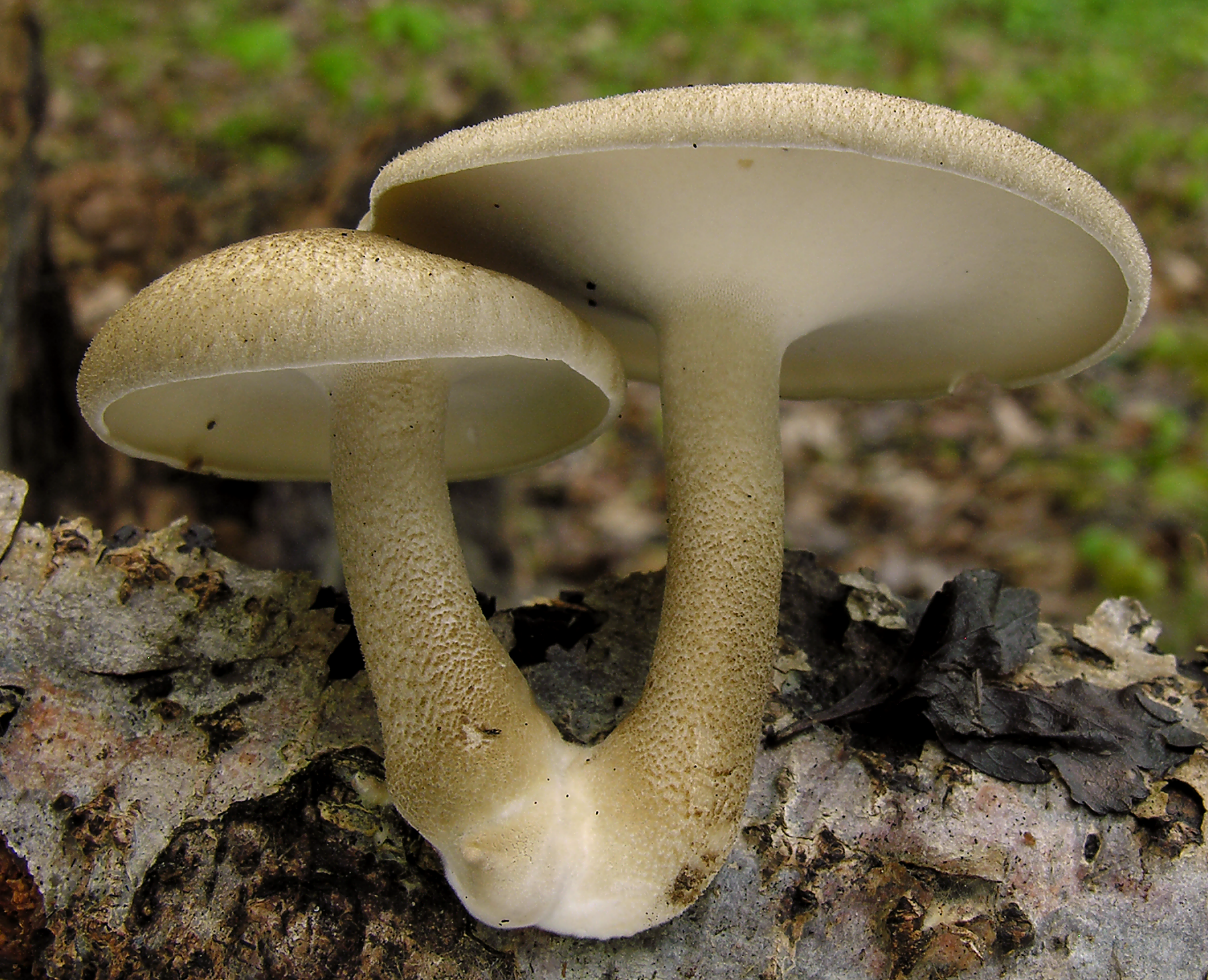

Scientific classification
- Kingdom: Fungi
- Division: Basidiomycota
- Class: Agaricomycetes
- Order: Polyporales
- Family: Polyporaceae
- Genus: Polyporus
- Species: P. ciliatus

Binomial name
- Polyporus ciliatus Fries 1815

= Polyporus ciliatus =

Species of fungus

Polyporus ciliatus is a species of fungus in the genus Polyporus.
