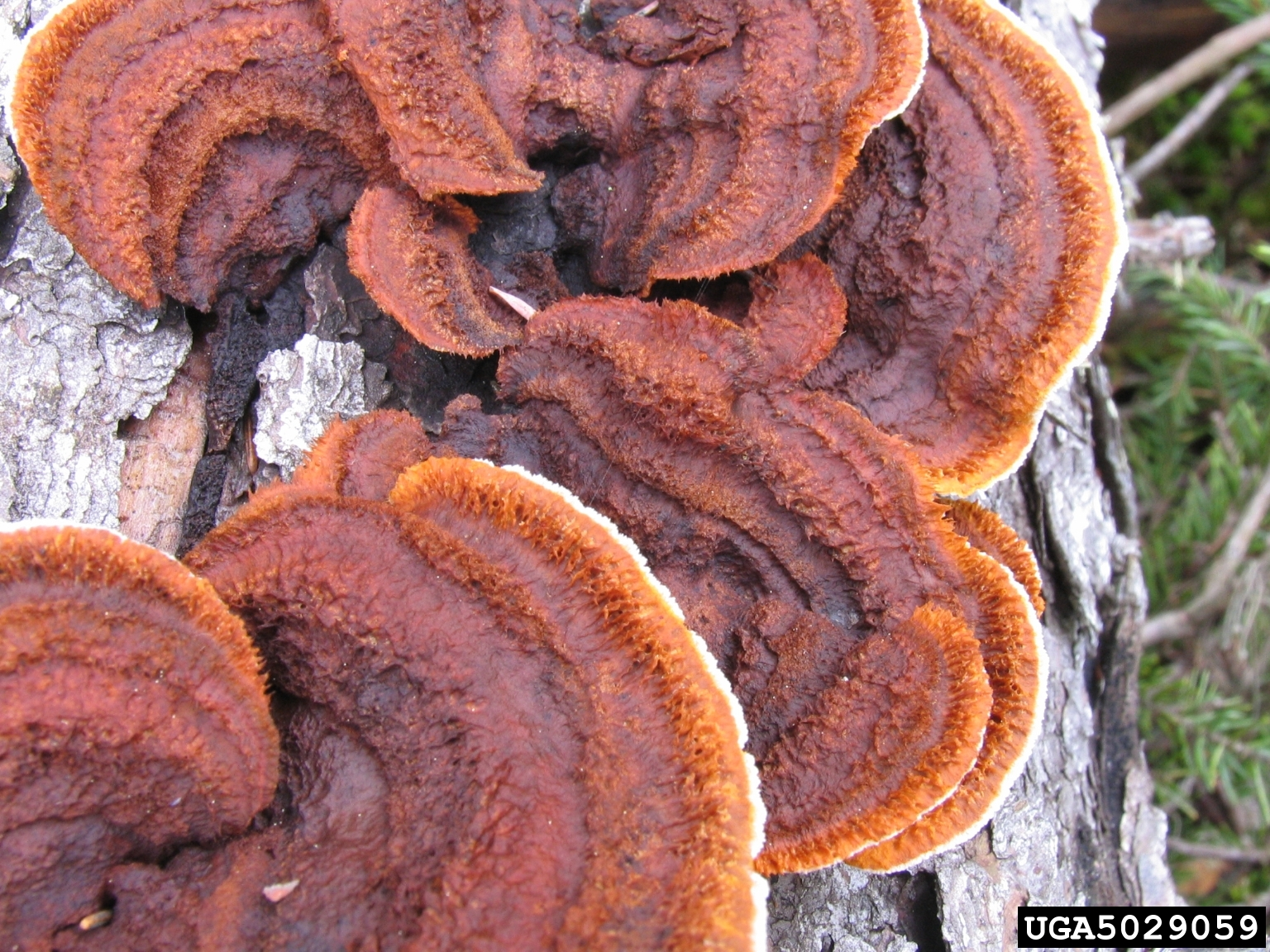
- Gloeophyllum sepiarium

Scientific classification
- Kingdom: Fungi
- Division: Basidiomycota
- Class: Agaricomycetes
- Order: Gloeophyllales; Thorn (2007)
- Family: Gloeophyllaceae; Jülich (1982)

Genera
- Boreostereum; Campylomyces; Gloeophyllum; Heliocybe; Mycothele; Neolentinus; Veluticeps

= Gloeophyllales =

Order of fungi

The Gloeophyllales are a phylogenetically defined order of wood-decay fungi that is characterized by the ability to produce a brown rot of wood. It includes a single, identically defined family, the Gloeophyllaceae, in which are included the genera Gloeophyllum, Neolentinus, Heliocybe, and Veluticeps.
