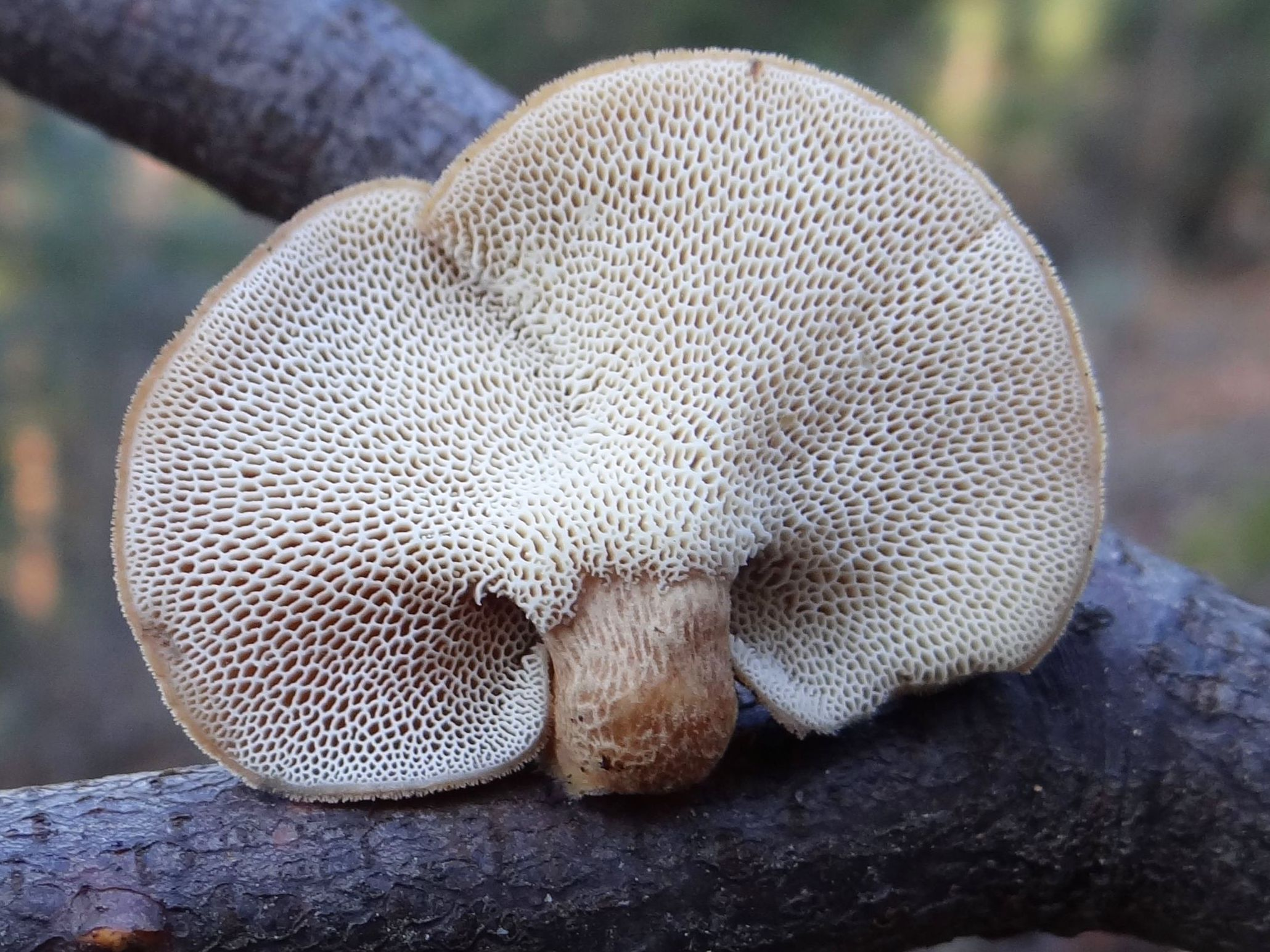

Scientific classification
- Kingdom: Fungi
- Division: Basidiomycota
- Class: Agaricomycetes
- Order: Polyporales
- Family: Polyporaceae
- Genus: Lentinus
- Species: L. brumalis

Binomial name
- Lentinus brumalis (Pers.) Zmitr. 2010

Synonyms
- Boletus brumalis Pers. 1794; Polyporus brumalis (Pers.) Fr. 1818; Polyporus fuscidulus (Schrad. ex J.F. Gmel.) Fr. 1838; Polyporus trachypus Rostk. 1848; Leucoporus brumalis (Pers.) Speg. 1926

= Lentinus brumalis =

Species of fungi

Lentinus brumalis
- Mycological characteristics
- Pores on hymenium
- Cap is offset
- Stipe is bare
- Spore print is white
- Ecology is saprotrophic
- Edibility is inedible

Lentinus brumalis is an inedible species of fungus in the family Polyporaceae. Its common name is the winter polypore. The epithet brumalis means "occurring in the winter", describing how this species tends to fruit during winter. It causes white rot on dead hardwood, and is distributed throughout the Northern Hemisphere in temperate and boreal zones.

== Taxonomy ==
Lentinus brumalis was first described as Boletus brumalis in 1794 by Christiaan Hendrik Persoon in his work "Neuer Versuch einer systematischen Eintheilung der Schwämme" (New attempt at a systematic classification of fungi). It was transferred to the current genus, Lentinus in 2010 by Ivan V. Zmitrovich.

== Description ==
=== Macroscopic characteristics ===
Lentinus brumalis has a round, broadly convex cap that has a diameter of 1.5 to 10 cm (1 to 4 in) and is 0.5 cm (0.20 in) thick. It is depressed in the middle and somewhat zoned. The surface of the cap is dry, though rarely hairy. It ranges from yellow-brown to dark brown in colour. The margin of the cap is often inrolled, particularly in young specimens.

There are 3 mm deep pores on the white to cream underside of the cap. They are spaced 2-4 pores per mm^{2}. They have moderately wide, (0.5-)1-1.5 mm large and roundish to almost diamond-shaped pores, which run down the stem a little (decurrent) and are therefore slightly elongated. They change in appearance from dull to lustrous when the orientation to light is changed. The spore print is white.

The stalk is 2.5 to 4 cm (1 to 2 in) long and 2–5 mm thick. It is gray to brown, occasionally with red tints and is generally lighter than the cap. Its dry surface is either smooth or finely felted to slightly scaly. The flesh is white and its consistency is tender to elastic. It does not have a particular taste or odour.

=== Microscopic characteristics ===
The spores are elliptic to cylindrical and measure 5–7 × 1.5–2.5 μm. They are smooth inamyloid, not changing colour when mounted with iodine. The basidia, club-shaped structures that bear spores, have 4 spores each and measure 16–22 × 5–6.5 μm. Cystidia, (large cells found on the fruiting bodies of some fungi) are absent.

Clamp connections are found throughout all tissue. The hyphal system is dimitic, made out of two types of hyphae. The generative hyphae of the flesh is 4–10 μm wide, colourless, thin-walled and occasionally branched. The binding hyphae of flesh has a similar colour and width, though it can sometimes swell up to 13 μm wide. It is thick-walled and nonseptate. It is frequently branched and the branches taper to 1–2 μm wide.

KOH does not affect the colour of any parts of this fungi (negative reaction). When stained by guiaic gum, the flesh turns blue, over a period of 6–12 hours.

=== Mycochemistry ===
L. brumalis produces the black pigment melanin, especially under high levels of moisture content (35%-55%) in the wood substrate. Lentinus brumalis degrades lignin in wood by producing enzymes, primarily lignin peroxidase and laccase.

=== Growth ===
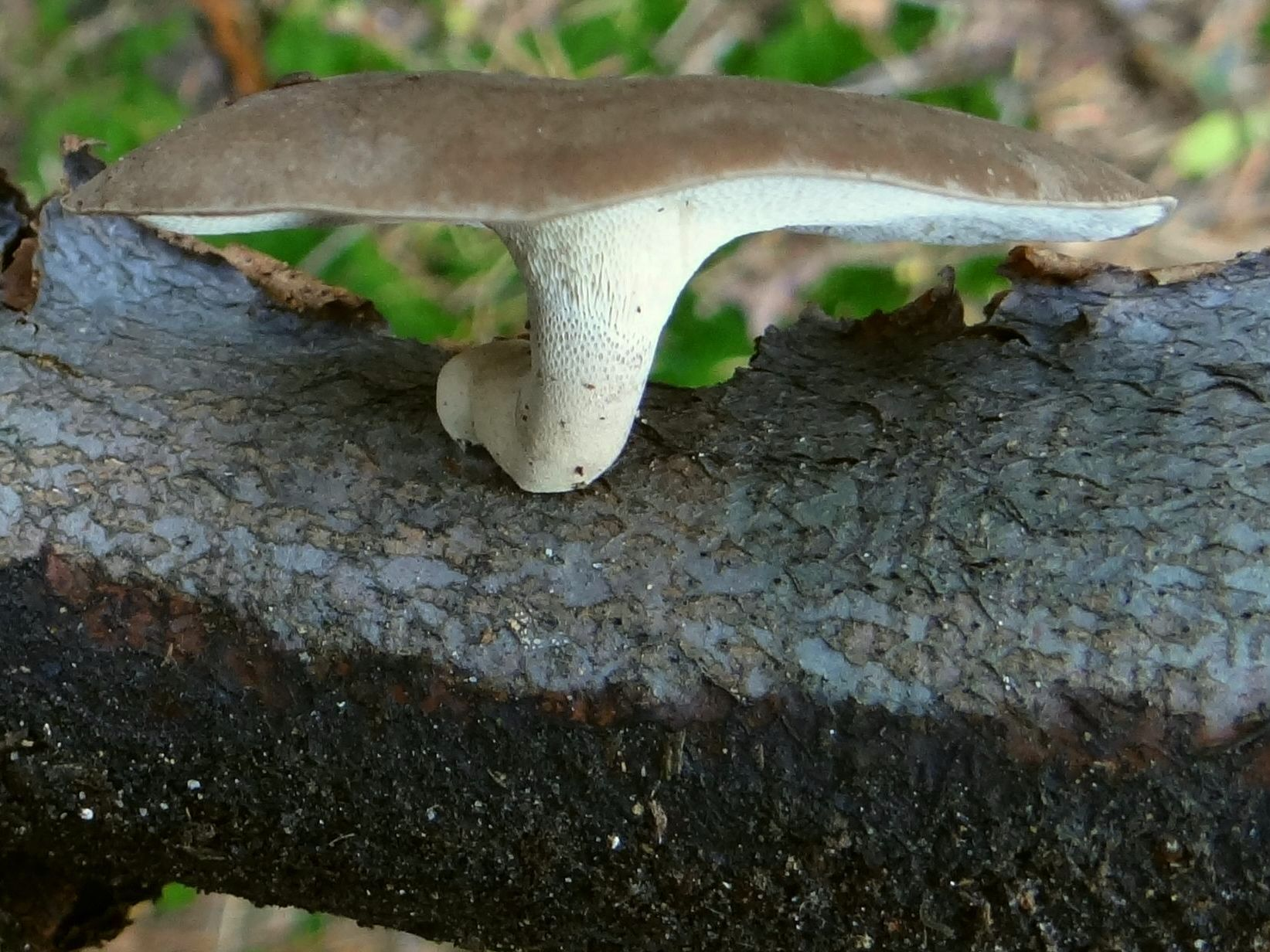
Lentinus brumalis

The stipe of Lentinus brumalis is strongly phototropic (grows towards light) before its cap forms. For example, a 12–300 second exposure to 1500 foot-candles of light can cause the stipe to curve 5–80° within 24 hours. After the cap has formed and reached a diameter of 9mm, the stipe stops growing towards the light, instead becoming strongly geotropic (growing away from gravitational pull).

== Ecology and distribution ==
It is saprotrophic on dead hardwoods, in particular, birch, beech and mountain ash, though in rare cases it grows on conifers such as hemlock and fir. In Uzbekistan, it grows on European nettle, willow and poplar trees as well. It grows solitary or in small groups. In North America, Lentinus brumalis is more common in the east, where it grows June through October. In Northern Europe, however it fruits in late October, and March.

== Similar species ==
A potential look-alike, Lentinus strictipes, can be distinguished from L brumalis as it does not fruit until April, as well as possessing smaller, and finer pores, that are rarely larger than 0.5 mm. A closer look-alike, L.arcularius (the spring polypore), differs from Lentinus brumalis in its larger pores, which are up to 2.5 mm wide, and easily recognizable even on young fruiting bodies. Neofavolus alveolaris has a paler cap, larger pores and spores and a more lateral stipe. L. longiporus has significantly longer pores and grows under willows and poplars in April and May. Cerioporus leptocephalus, Cerioporus varius and Picipes melanopus all have a dark black stipe that is not found on L. brumalis.

== Research ==
Cultures of L. brumalis have been taken onto three different satellites (the Salyut-5 orbital station, the Salyut 6 orbital station and the Cosmo 690) to research the effects of weightlessness, space orientation and light on the geotropism and formation of its fruiting bodies. In the absence of gravity and light, the stipe grew strongly twisted into a spiral or ball, and caps did not form, though in the presence of light, there was little anatomical difference from control samples. However, on Salyut 6, with the samples in the dark, they formed no fruiting bodies.

L. brumalis has been studied for its potential ability to degrade dibutyl phthalate. A study in 2007 reported that dibutyl phthalate was nearly eliminated from a culture medium of L. brumalis within 12 days, potentially through transesterification and de-esterification.

== Uses ==
The fruiting body of L. brumalis is inedible, and it has no use as a dyestuff as it yields little to no colour.
