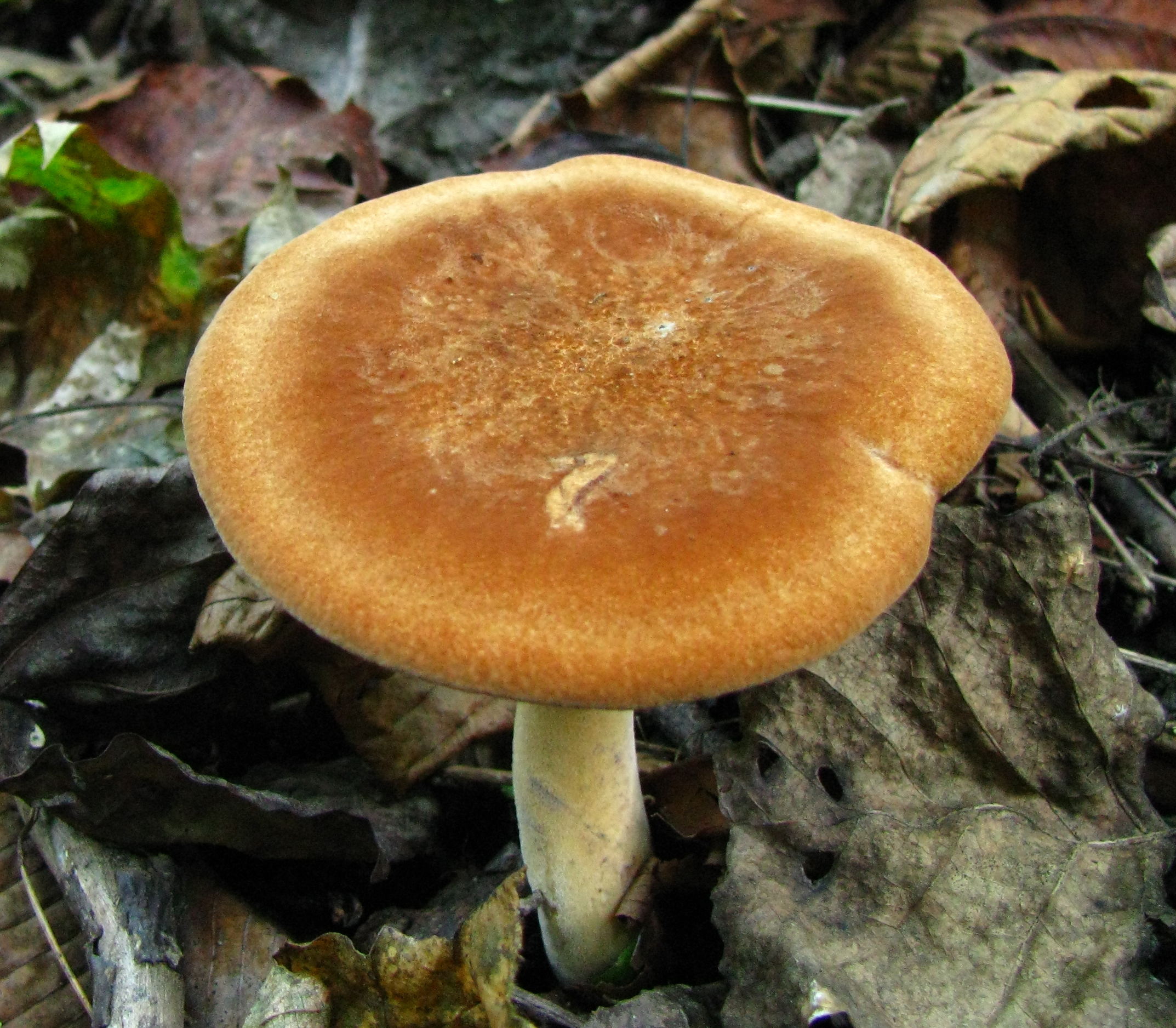

Scientific classification
- Kingdom: Fungi
- Division: Basidiomycota
- Class: Agaricomycetes
- Order: Polyporales
- Family: Polyporaceae
- Genus: Polyporus
- Species: P. radicatus

Binomial name
- Polyporus radicatus Schwein. (1832)

= Polyporus radicatus =

Species of fungus

Polyporus radicatus is a species of fungus in the family Polyporaceae. It was described as new to science by German-American botanist Lewis David de Schweinitz in 1832. It is found in North America, including Mexico. It grows on the ground, probably from buried roots or originating from sclerotia. Its spores are more or less ellipsoid to spindle shaped, measuring 12–15 by 6–8 μm. It is inedible.

This species is the preferred food of the larvae (but not the adults) of the pleasing fungus beetle Tritoma mimetica, and has been recorded as an occasional food item of adults of the related T.humeralis. Also, adults of the related Rotitma sanguinipennis have been recorded from P.radicatus, but it does not seem to be a regular food source for them.
