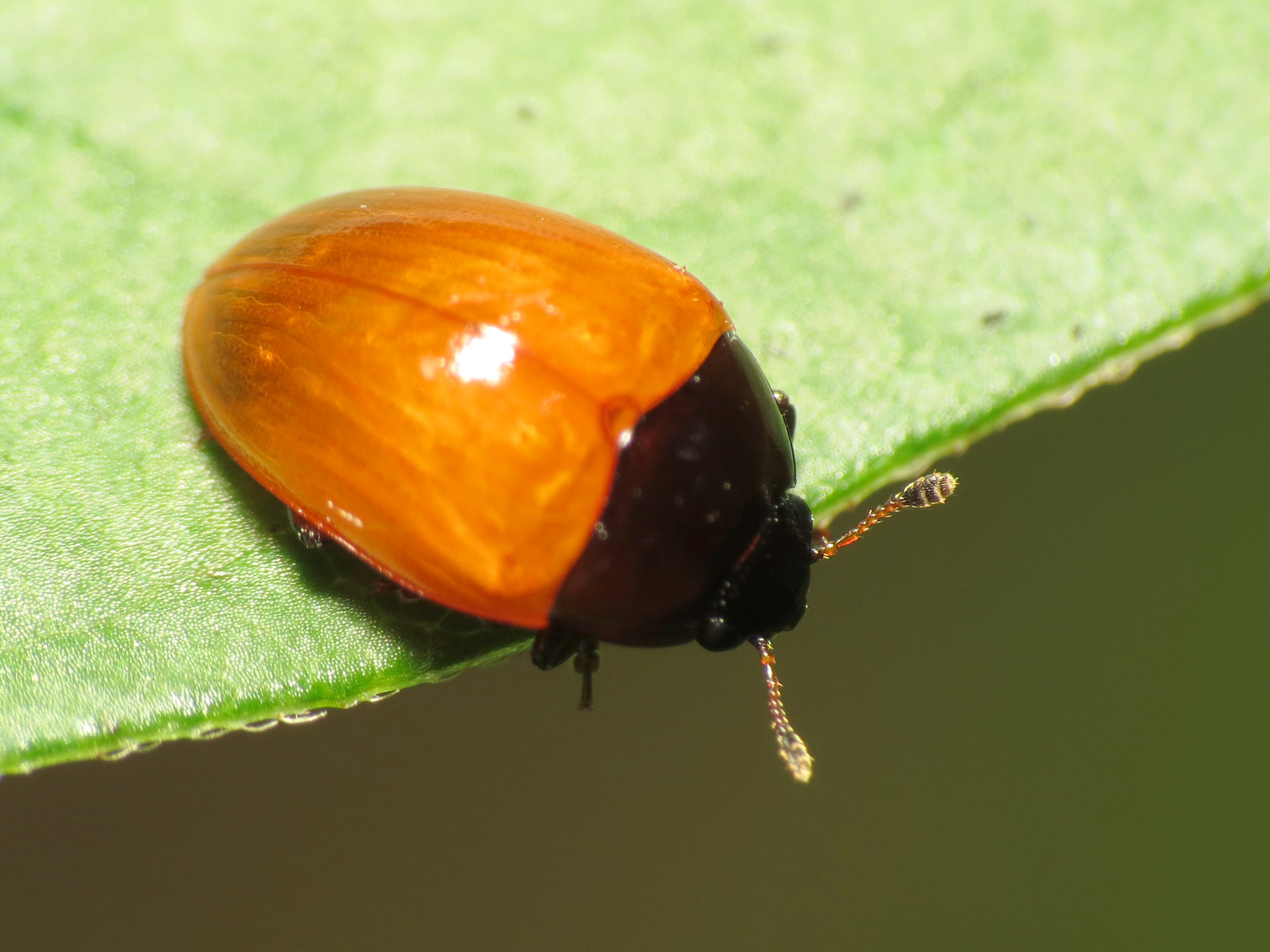

Scientific classification
- Kingdom: Animalia
- Phylum: Arthropoda
- Clade: Pancrustacea
- Class: Insecta
- Order: Coleoptera
- Suborder: Polyphaga
- Infraorder: Cucujiformia
- Family: Erotylidae
- Genus: Rotitma
- Species: R. sanguinipennis

Binomial name
- Rotitma sanguinipennis (Say, 1825)

Synonyms
- Mycotretus sanguinipennis (Say, 1825); Triplax sanguinipennis Say, 1825; Tritoma sanguinipennis (Say, 1825)

= Rotitma sanguinipennis =

Species of beetle

Rotitma sanguinipennis, the red-winged tritoma, is a North American species of small pleasing fungus beetle (family Erotylidae). It belongs to subfamily Tritominae, or – in taxonomic arrangements that prefer a more comprehensive subfamily Erotylinae – in tribe Tritomini of the Erotylinae.

Traditionally, this species was placed in genus Tritoma; whether its move to the otherwise Asian genus Rotitma – formerly a subgenus of Tritoma – is indeed correct remains to be determined.

== Description ==
The red-winged tritoma is a tiny beetle, about 3.1-5.1 mm long and 2-3.2 mm wide as adults, with a wide body, pointed wingtips, and a blunt head. The elytra and scutellum, most of the abdomen , the "stems" of the antennae, and the palps are yellowish red. The "clubs" of the antennae are dark chestnut brown, and there usually is a more or less pronounced blackish wash on the first two segments of the abdomen. The elytra have lengthwise lines of small punctures, which may be darker or lighter than the rest of the elytra, resulting in a dark hue or a "water-soaked" appearance. Otherwise, the carapace is pitch-black.

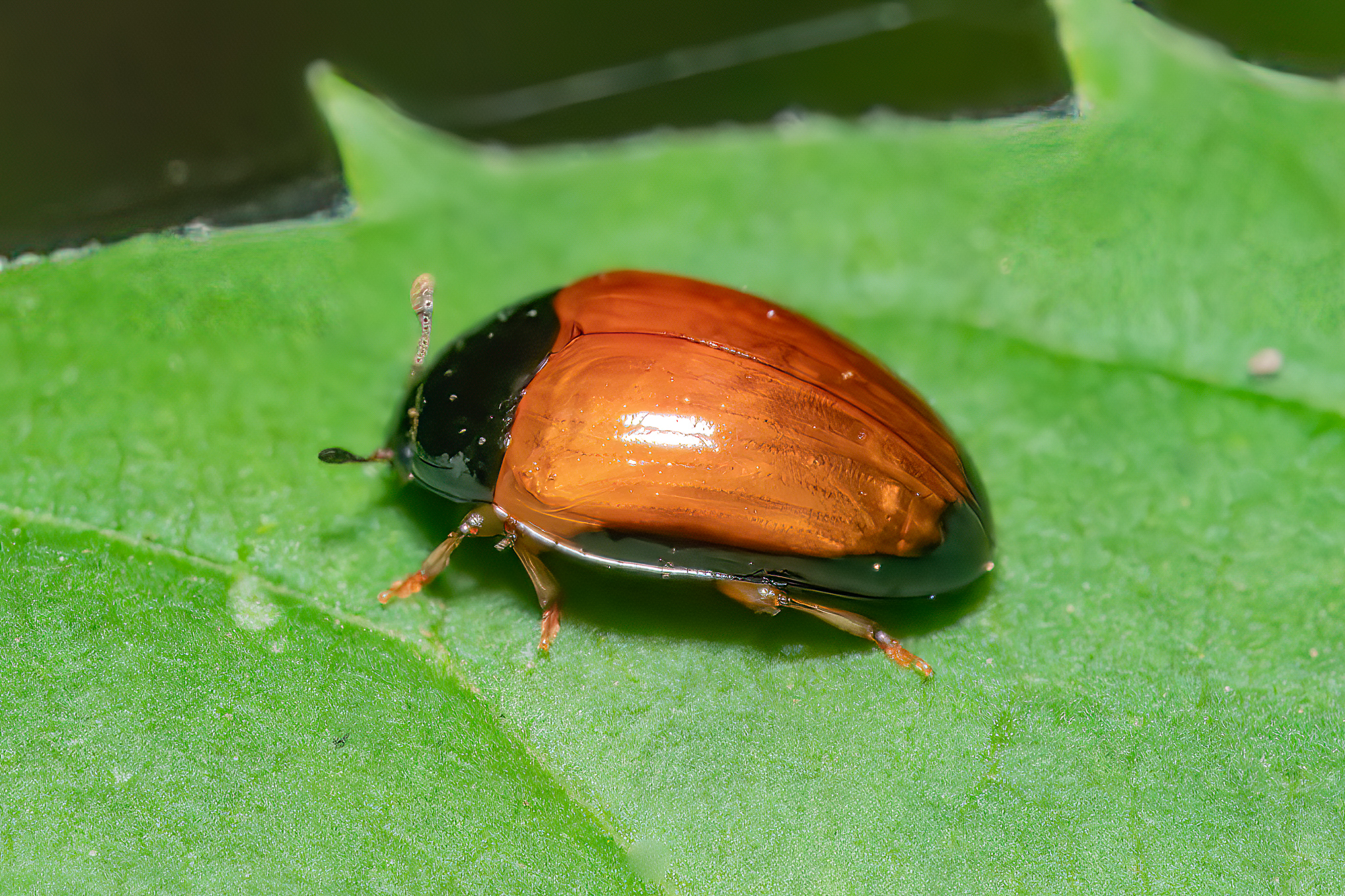
Tritoma mimetica resembles R. sanguinipennis in coloration, but has black-fringed wings

From Tritoma proper, R. sanguinipennis can be distinguished by an epistome whose tip has a distinctly angular V-shaped indentation; in the males, a line runs exactly parallel to this angled edge between the antennae insertions, and the much larger and pentagonal mentum. Also, the coloration distinguishes it from its North American relatives, with only Tritoma mimetica being similar; that species, however, has a black elytra fringe.

Head
The head has small compound eyes have tiny ommatidia, indicating a diurnal or crepuscular lifestyle, but with overall rather little reliance on eyesight. Its surface is densely covered with small punctures. Adults possess file-like structures at the sides of the neck attachment, which, when the beetle wiggles its head, rub against the chitin and produce a squeaking sound; the degree of development of these structures is unreliable for distinguishing males and females. The epistome has a characteristical concave tip, which in males is exactly paralleled by a smoothly curving transverse stripe separating a narrow margin from the bulk of the epistome. The "cheek" lobes below the compound eyes are fairly large – half as long as the compound eyes, and reaching to their inner edges when seen from below –, with curving sides that come closer towards the front. The antenna length is less than half of the pronotal base width, with antenna segment 3 almost as long as the segments 4 and 5 together, and a "clubbed" antenna tip which is about half again as long as it is wide.

The galea and lacinia of the maxilla resemble those of the related genus Triplax, except for the lack of teeth at the tip of the lacinia. The maxillary palps have an end segment that is wide and somewhat triangular. It does not seem to carry a brush, but there might be a vestigial brush hidden within a slit at the tip. The labium has a mentum that is pentagonal and comparatively huge. The labial palps end in a narrow segment with a strong bristle at the outer side and a tiny brush at the tip.

Body, wings and legs
The prothorax is almost as wide at the base as the wings at their widest point. The pronotum is fairly wide and trapezoid-shaped, with strongly curving sides, and the rear edge more than half again as long as the forward edge, which slightly bulges in the middle. It is sparsely strewn with punctures, larger than those on the head, in the center; towards the sides of the pronotum, the punctures become gradually smaller and more dense. A thin margin runs around the sides and front of the pronotum, but is absent from the rear. There are weak dimples at each side of the midline of the rear pronotum, in which the punctures are particularly large, and in each pronotal corner there is a small and inconspicuous pore. The prosternum has lengthwise lines along the center margin of the leg attachments which extend straightly forward of the attachment points of the forelegs, but do not meet at the prosternum tip.

On the metasternum, the lines between the leg attachments are clearly engraved, and extend to about halfway between the rear edge of the leg attachment and the side of the metasternum. The scutellum is bluntly heart-shaped. The elytra lack a distinct margin at the base, except for a very slim margin in front of the "shoulders". The attachments of each leg pair are widely separated. The tibiae are barely widened towards the ends; their upper/outer edge is narrowed to a very thin "razor edge" towards the tip. Segment 4 of the tarsi is reduced, and attached to the upper centerside of segment 3.

On the abdomen, coxal lines are present, and the intercoxal process is wide and has a cut-off or slightly rounded tip. The aedeagus of the male genitalia differs from Tritoma sensu stricto by greater robustness and sclerotization. The internal sac protrudes through a hole in the middle foramen and extends tipward of the median lobe for about one-third the length of the median strut; its forward end lacks a distinct muscle attachment, but – like in the type species of Tritoma, T. bipustulata – has some short lengthwise sclerotized stripes. The tube of the female genitalia is shortened like in typical Tritoma, but unlike in these it is strongly sclerotized. The valvifers are also more triangular, with their sides converging to the rear if seen from above or below.

== Range and ecology ==
Rotitma sanguinipennis is found in North America east of the Rocky Mountains. The type specimen, like many beetles collected by Thomas Say, is probably lost; its type locality was not given more precisely than "United States", referring to the U.S. territory around 1820. The species occurs from Maine to Quebec, Ontario and Minnesota in the north, and from Georgia and the Florida panhandle to Arkansas in the south. The western limit are Iowa, Kansas and southeastern Nebraska. It ranges northwards at least to Ottawa, Ontario, to Johnstown, Newport and Olcott (all in upstate New York), and to Houston County, Minnesota. Its southern limit is not well understood, in particular how far it ranges into Florida. The westernmost extent of its range is at least to Washington County, Arkansas (and it might occur in nearby northeastern Oklahoma), Riley County, Kansas, Fontenelle Forest in Nebraska (where it was first collected in 1997), and Sioux City, Iowa. Isolated records from elsewhere, e.g. the Yucatán Peninsula, are probably due to erroneous identifications of species or locality.

These beetles seem to be active earlier in the year than most of their relatives. As far north as Putnam County, Illinois, they have been collected on a March 16, and in the Catskill Mountains of upstate New York on March 22. Throughout their range they become notably more plentiful in late May, and are most abundant in midsummer, up to late July or early August. While many related Erotylidae are still on the wing in considerable numbers in late summer, R. sanguinipennis seems to go into hibernation quite early – it becomes notably less active in August already, and an October 4 record at Jeannette, Pennsylvania, is rather exceptional.

Larvae and pupae of R. sanguinipennis have been described in detail, and the adults are known for being easily collected with Malaise traps in summer. Not infrequently, they are found associated with Tritoma humeralis, and somewhat less often with T. mimetica. These species have somewhat more indiscriminate feeding habits, and appear to be most plentiful in late summer, which probably prevents too intense competition.

=== Food ===
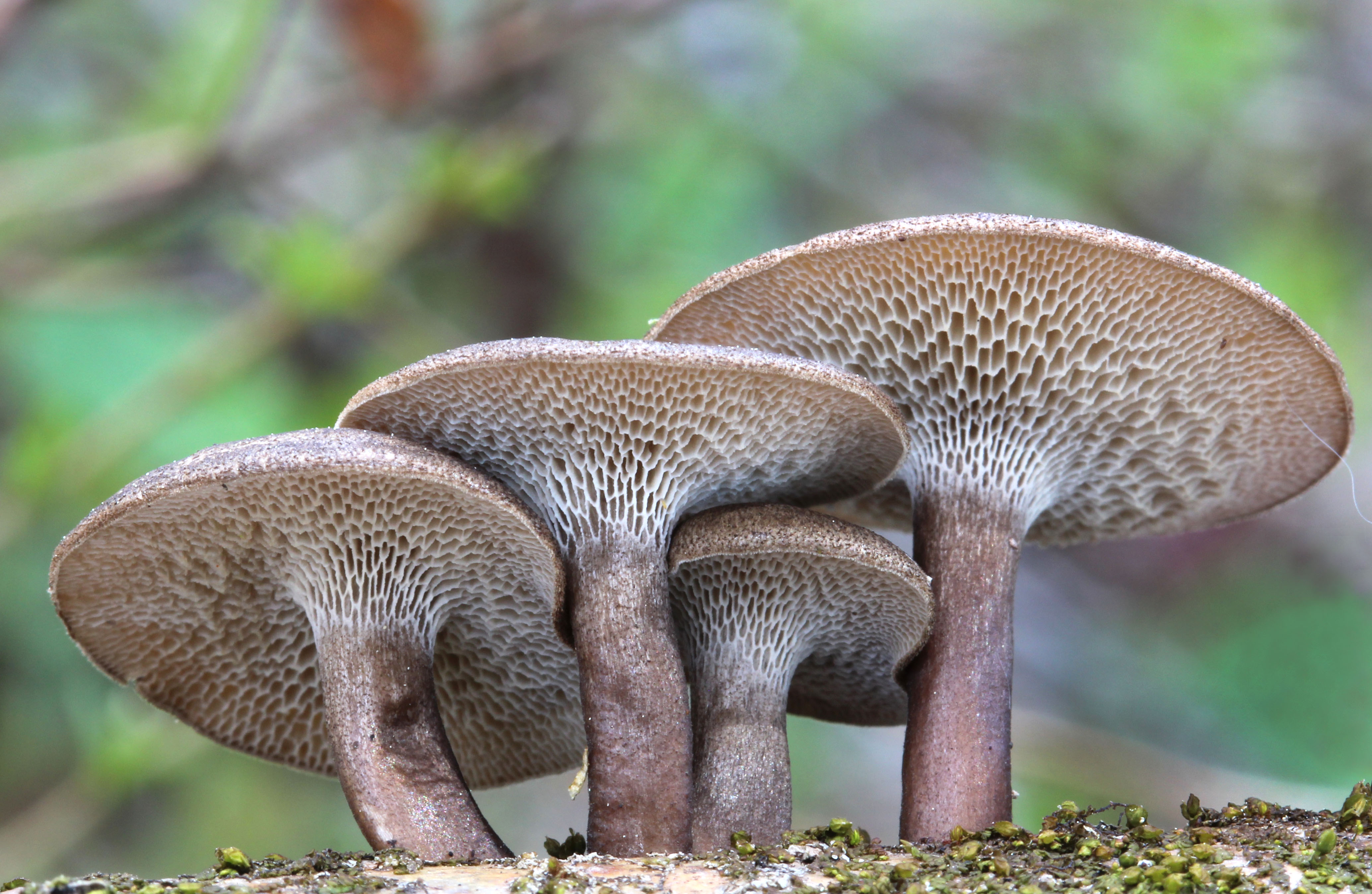
The favorite food of R. sanguinipennis larvae: Spring polypores (Vonore, Tennessee)

This beetle eats fungi as larva and adults, with a strong preference for bracket fungi of family Polyporaceae in the order Polyporales. Most recorded hosts belong to the erstwhile genus "Polyporus sensu lato", which is nowadays heavily split up. Namely, the spring polypore Lentinus arcularius has been recorded as the main larval food of R. sanguinipennis. Adults are also frequently encountered on the hexagonal-pored polypore Neofavolus alveolaris or – if its North American populations are treated as distinct species – N. americanus. Occasionally, they are found on black-footed polypore (Picipes badius), dryad's saddle (Cerioporus squamosus), and Polyporus radicatus; one specimen was supposedly collected on a death cap (Amanita phalloides; Agaricales: Amanitaceae), but this record is considered spurious, possibly a misidentification of T. mimetica. However, these scant records do not necessarily imply that the beetles were actually feeding on those fungus species rather than simply sheltering there, or that the fungus in question was even correctly identified; at any rate, none of these species seems to be suitable as larval food for R. sanguinipennis.
