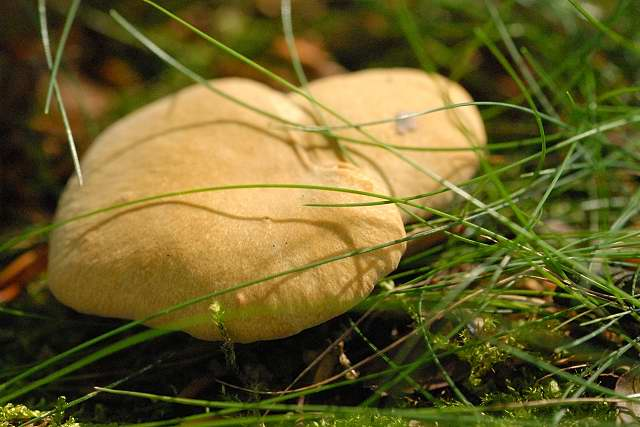
- Cerioporus leptocephalus

Scientific classification
- Domain: Eukaryota
- Kingdom: Fungi
- Division: Basidiomycota
- Class: Agaricomycetes
- Order: Polyporales
- Family: Polyporaceae
- Genus: Cerioporus
- Species: C. leptocephalus

Binomial name
- Cerioporus leptocephalus (Jacq.) Zmitr. (2016)

= Cerioporus leptocephalus =

Species of fungus

Mycological characteristics
- Pores on hymenium
- Cap is flat
- Hymenium is decurrent
- Stipe is bare
- Spore print is white
- Ecology is saprotrophic
- Edibility is inedible

Cerioporus leptocephalus, commonly known as blackfoot polypore, is an inedible species of mushroom in the genus Cerioporus.

== Taxonomy ==
Formerly placed in the genus Polyporus, the species was moved into Cerioporus in 2016.

== Description ==
The cap is convex when young, and soon flattens out into a mostly irregular shape. It is red-brown when young, yellowish grey when old and up to about 4 centimetres (1 1/2 in) in diameter. The pores are white, turning slightly brown when bruised, and the spores are white. The stem is light yellowish brown, often with a black base.

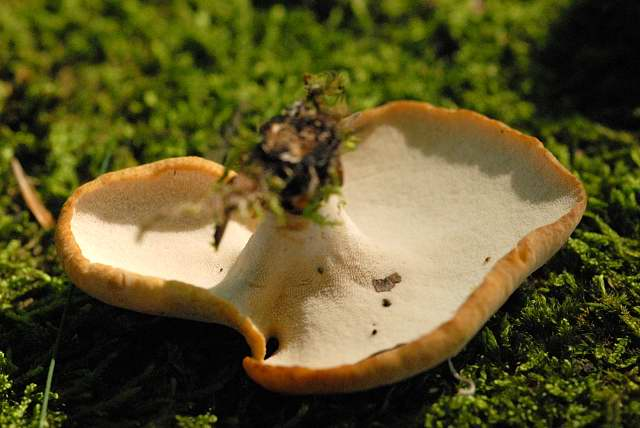
The mushroom's underside

=== Similar species ===
There are two other polypores with a black stem at the base, Polyporus badius with a shiny red-brown to purple-black cap which can grow up to 20 cm (8 in) across, and the dark brown, velvety Polyporus melanopus, which grows up to 10 cm across and can be found on dead wood.

== Distribution and habitat ==
It can be found in North America, from January to April on the West Coast and May–July in the east. It usually grows on hardwood twigs and branches.
