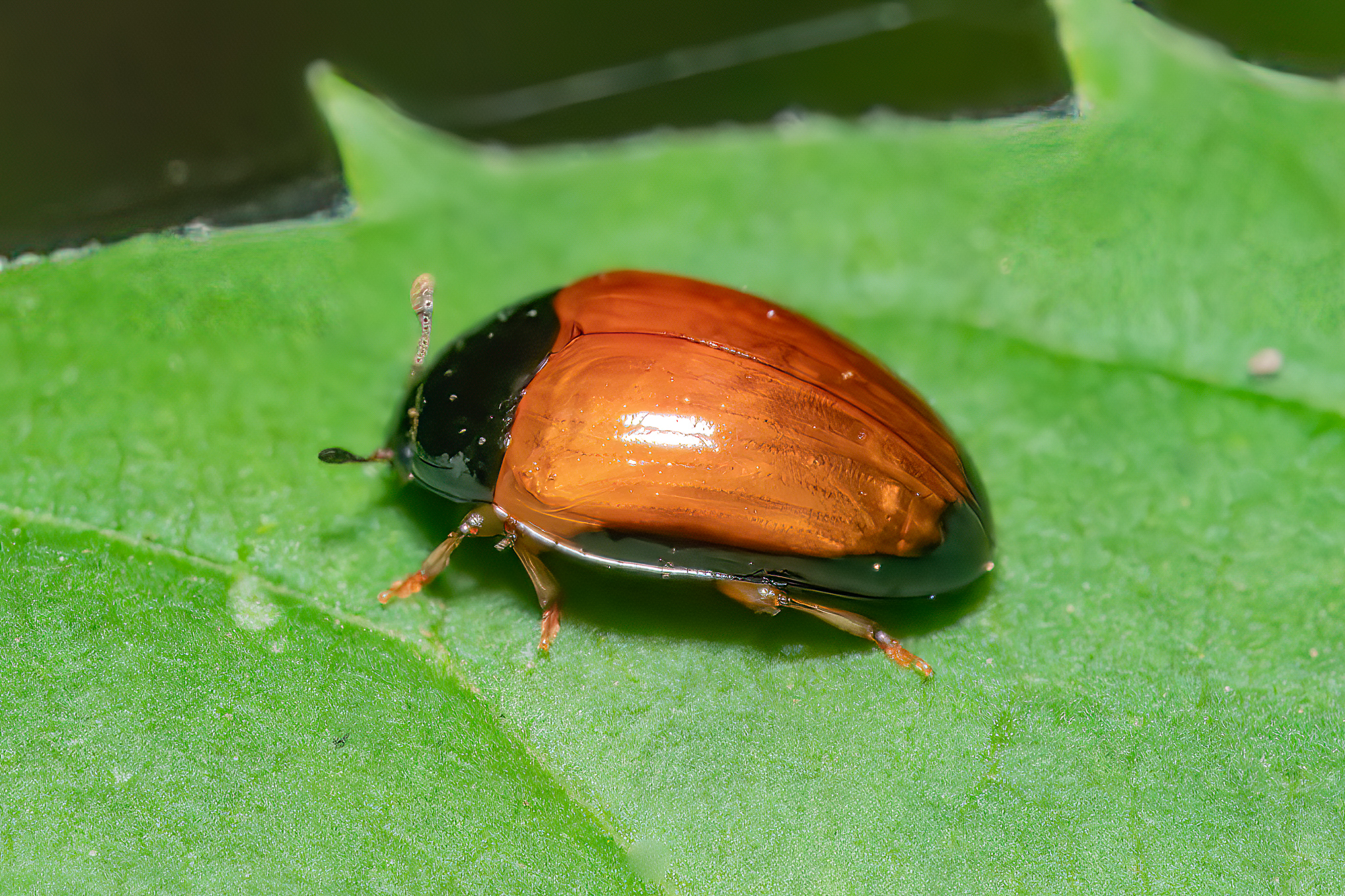
- Adult in Beamer Memorial Conservation Area, Canada

Scientific classification
- Kingdom: Animalia
- Phylum: Arthropoda
- Clade: Pancrustacea
- Class: Insecta
- Order: Coleoptera
- Suborder: Polyphaga
- Infraorder: Cucujiformia
- Family: Erotylidae
- Subfamily: Erotylinae
- Tribe: Tritomini
- Genus: Tritoma
- Species: T. mimetica

Binomial name
- Tritoma mimetica (Crotch, 1873)

Synonyms
- Cyrtotriplax mimetica Crotch, 1873

= Tritoma mimetica =

Species of beetle

Tritoma mimetica is a North American species of small pleasing fungus beetle (family Erotylidae). It belongs to subfamily Tritominae, or – in taxonomic arrangements that prefer a more comprehensive subfamily Erotylinae – in tribe Tritomini of the Erotylinae.

== Description ==
This is a tiny beetle, about 3-5 mm long and 2-3 mm wide as adults, and widely oval in shape with somewhat pointed wingtips and a distinctly blunter head. They have a black head and pronotum, while elytra and scutellum are orange-red, with a black margin around the elytra which is thickest at the wingtips and otherwise individually varies from a barely visible stripe to a broad margin. The nape has a red spot, but this is only visible when the head is bent downwards. The underside is blackish-brown, with lighter brown sides, and the legs are orange-brown except for the black trochanters. The "stalks" of the antennae are orange-red, while the antennal "clubs" are black. As typical for Tritoma sensu stricto, T. mimetica has a triangular mentum, as well as an epistome whose tip is sharply cut off, causing the line running parallel to the epistome margin to angle towards the antennae insertions.

The species' scientific name mimetica – from Ancient Greek μῑμητικός "looking like someone else" – refers to the fact that this species is intermediate in appearance between (and often confused with) the handsome tritoma and the red-winged tritoma, which are nowadays often moved to distinct genera, as Aporotritoma pulchra and Rotitma sanguinipennis, respectively. Apart from the traits mentioned above, which distinguish Tritoma sensu stricto from Aporotritoma and Rotitma, A. pulchra is darker than T. mimetica, with underside, legs and scutellum uniformly black, and the black elytral margin much wider, reducing the reddish coloration to a heart-shaped spot. On the other hand, R. sanguinipennis is less dark than T. mimetica: its elytra lack a black margin, and the underside of its abdomen is orange.

Head
The head has small compound eyes have tiny ommatidia, indicating a diurnal or crepuscular lifestyle, but with overall rather little reliance on eyesight. Its surface is covered in small punctures which are densely arranged, separated by less than their diameter. Adults possess file-like structures at the sides of the neck attachment, which, when the beetle wiggles its head, rub against the chitin and produce a squeaking sound; the degree of development of these structures is unreliable for distinguishing males and females. The epistome has a narrow but unbroken angled margin around the straight tip; a transverse stripe separates the margin from the bulk of the epistome. The "cheek" lobes below the compound eyes are vestigial, do not reach to the lower edge of the eyes, and are covered by the ends of the maxillary palps. The antenna length is less than half of the pronotal base width, with antenna segment 3 almost as long as the segments 4 and 5 together, and a "clubbed" antenna tip which is about half again as long as it is wide and ends with a small segment 11.

The galea and lacinia of the maxilla resemble those of the related genera Ischyrus and Pseudischyrus; those of Triplax are also similar except for having two small curved teeth at the tip of the lacinia. The maxillary palps have an end segment that is rounded, somewhat triangular, and a bit more than half as long as it is wide; it lacks a conspicuous brush at the tip. The labium has a mentum that is mid-sized and fairly narrowly triangular. The labial palps end in a narrow segment with a strong bristle at the outer side and a tiny brush at the tip, and the mouth-cavity sides are flattened lobes.

Body, wings and legs
The prothorax is almost as wide at the base as the wings at their widest point. The pronotum is fairly wide and trapezoid-shaped, with the rear edge more than half again as long as the forward edge, and covered in punctures which are sparse in the middle but towards the sides become denser, separated by less than their diameter. A thin margin runs around the sides and front of the pronotum, but is absent from the rear. In each corner of the pronotum, there is a small and inconspicuous pore. The prosternum is bell-shaped, with lengthwise lines at the center margin of the leg attachments extending to the forward edge of the prosternum and sharply curving towards each other in front of the leg attachments.

On the metasternum, the lines between the leg attachments are clearly engraved, and extend to about halfway between the rear edge of the leg attachment and the side of the metasternum. The scutellum is bluntly heart-shaped. The elytra are ornamented with regular lines of small punctuations; they also lack a distinct margin at the base, except for a very slim margin in front of the "shoulders".

The attachments of each leg pair are widely separated. The tibiae are somewhat widened towards the ends; their upper/outer edge is narrowed to a very thin "razor edge" towards the tip. The first three segments of the tarsi are increasingly widened; segment 4 of the tarsi is reduced, attached to the upper centerside of segment 3, and rigidly joined to segment 5.

On the abdomen, coxal lines are present, and the intercoxal process is wide and has a cut-off or slightly rounded tip. Males and females do not have conspicuously different external abdominal structures. The aedeagus of the male genitalia resembles Pseudischyrus. The tegminal arms are firmly joined at the forward end, form a tooth-like lobe on the upper sides just in front of the basal piece, and have a narrow and almost membranous section below. The median strut does not exceed the median lobe in length. The internal sac is short and entirely hidden within the sclerotized median lobe; its anterior end lacks conspicuous point-like muscle attachments. The ejaculatory duct does not continue into the internal sac. The female genitalia are conspicuously shortened, but all parts are present and functional. Only the proctigeral and vulvar lobes are close to the typical size in Erotylidae; at the eighth abdominal segment, the genital tube has short and weakly sclerotized lines. The seminal receptacle is small, rounded, and bears a short well-sclerotized arm.

== Distribution and ecology ==
Tritoma mimetica is found in eastern to central North America, occurring from Quebec and upstate New York to Michigan, Illinois and Iowa in the north, and from Georgia to southwestern Arkansas and northeastern Texas in the south. It barely ranges into the Great Plains region, with its western limit probably being in the region of Topeka, Kansas; to the north, it occurs at least up to Newport, Elbridge and Niagara Falls, New York, Grand Ledge and Oakland County, Michigan, Chicago, Illinois, Ames, Iowa. Its southern limit is not well-understood, and to what extent (if at all) it ranges into Florida is particularly unclear.

The type specimen, number 6769 in the MCZ LeConte collection, was found at an unspecified location in Illinois. It is an adult of undetermined sex.

Adults are active whenever the ground is not frozen – April to November as far north as Illinois, and probably year-round in the south of its range. Like many of their relatives, they are easily collected with Malaise traps in summer. Not infrequently, the adults of T. mimetica are found associated with the related species T. biguttata, T. humeralis and Rotitma sanguinipennis. Of these, T. biguttata specializes in Amanita and R. sanguinipennis in Polyporaceae as a food source, while T. humeralis has similar feeding preferences as T. mimetica, but is even less specialized; this niche partitioning seems to prevent unsustainable competition between those species.

=== Food ===
This beetle eats fungi as larva and adults. Like many Tritoma sensu stricto, adults have a strong preference for gilled fungi, but unlike some of its rather specialized relatives, the feeding habits of T. mimetica are fairly indiscriminate by pleasing fungus beetle standards. However, it differs from many relatives, whose larvae have similar (albeit more specialized) feeding habits as the adults, by utilizing different fungus species at the different stages of its life cycle:

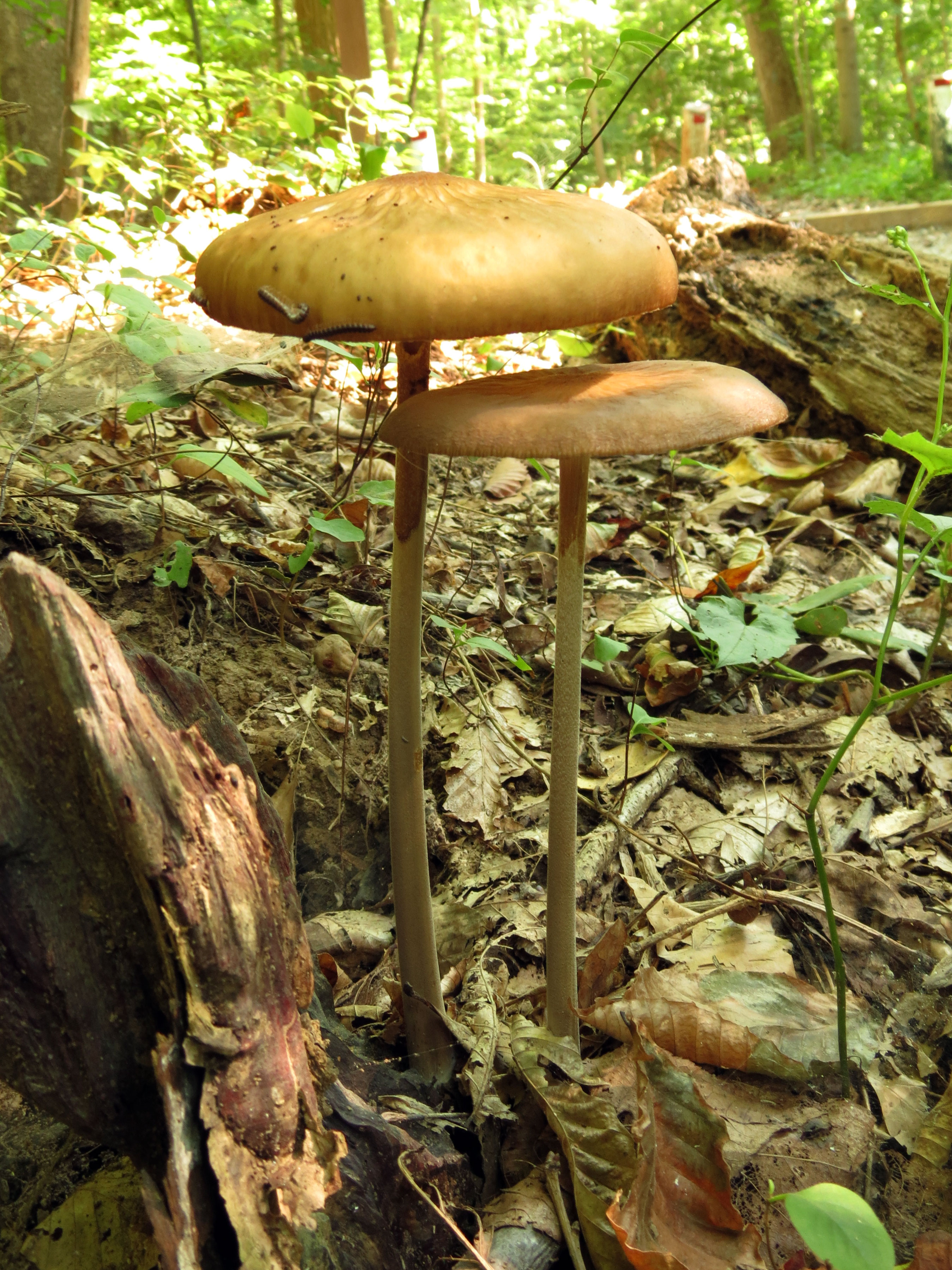
The favorite food of T.mimetica adults: Rooting shanks (Rock Creek Park, Washington, DC)

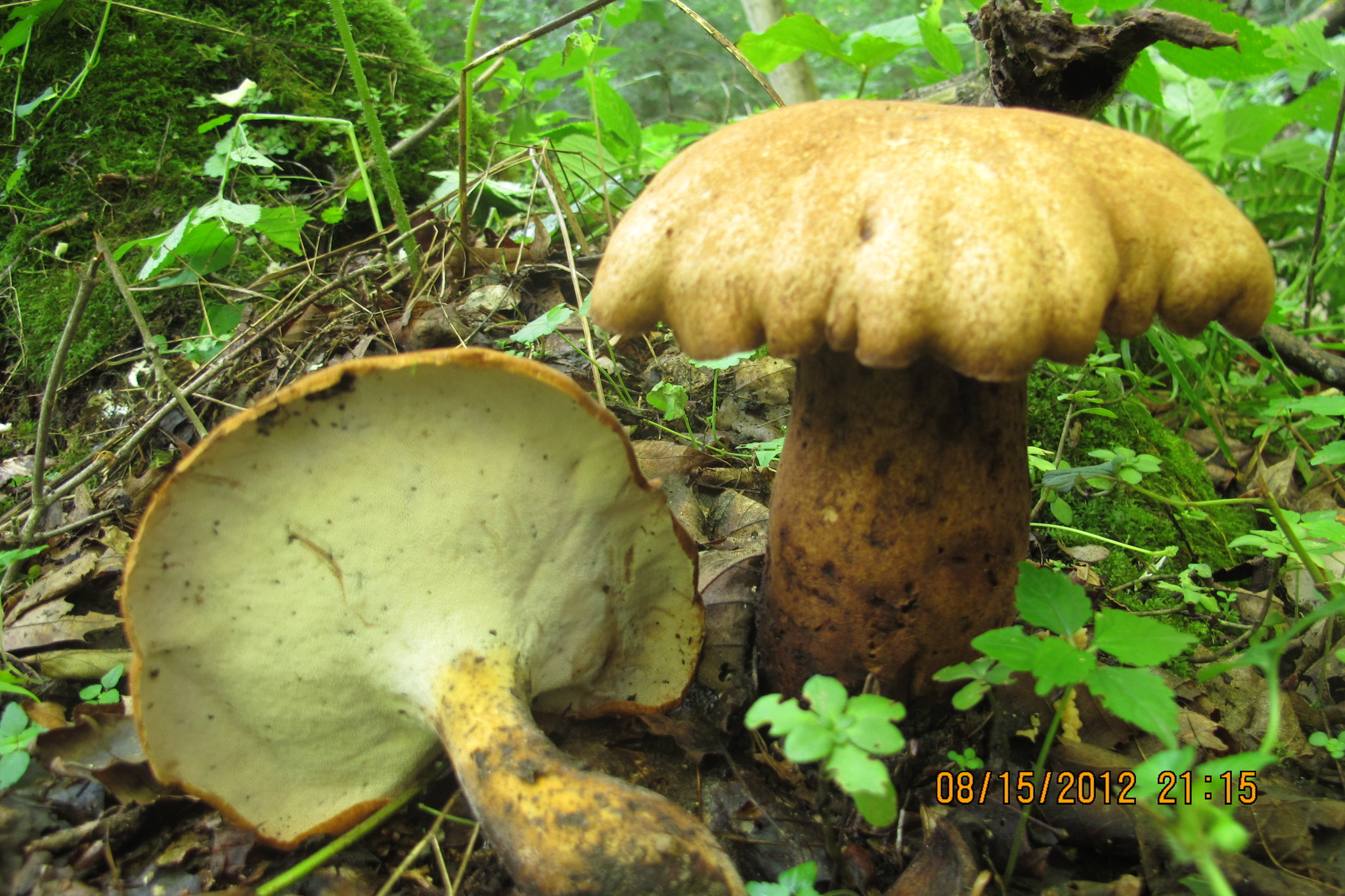
T.mimetica larvae prefer to eat Polyporus radicatus (Calcutta, Ohio)

Adults are commonly found on mushrooms of family Physalacriaceae in order Agaricales, mainly the rooting shank (Hymenopellis radicata) and its relative H.rugosoceps – both usually still included in the related genera Oudemansiella or Xerula in older sources –, or less commonly on the honey mushroom Armillaria mellea; the latter is known to be a species complex today, so the record might actually refer to other honey mushroom species.

Occasionally, Amanitaceae such as the grisette amanita (A.vaginata) and the tawny grisette (Amanita fulva) or its relative A.amerifulva have been recorded as food of adult T. mimetica, as have been various members of the erstwhile genus "Polyporus sensu lato", which is nowadays heavily split up into numerous genera of family Polyporaceae in order Polyporales. In addition, there are a few records from the Physalacriaceae Hymenopellis furfuracea, from an undetermined species of "Marasmius" – which may refer to various species in families Marasmiaceae, Omphalotaceae or (perhaps most likely) Physalacriaceae –, and from one of the American Megacollybia species which were recently separated from the European M.platyphylla and belong into Marasmiaceae. Reports of Aporotritoma pulchra on the green-cracking brittlegill R. virescens (Russulales: Russulaceae) or one of its relatives (R. crustosa/R. parvovirescens), and of Rotitma sanguinipennis on a death cap (Amanita phalloides), more likely refer to misidentified T. mimetica, as both A. pulchra nor R. sanguinipennis are well-known but easily confused with T. mimetica, and have not otherwise been recorded feeding on those fungi. None of those occasional records, however, necessarily imply that the beetles were actually feeding on those fungus species rather than simply sheltering there, or that the fungus in question was correctly identified.

The larvae of T. mimetica are not well studied, but it is known that they are rarely if ever found in Physalacriaceae. Instead, they feed on "Polyporus" s.l. such as the hexagonal-pored polypore Neofavolus alveolaris (or N. americanus if that is considered a distinct species), the dryad's saddle (Cerioporus squamosus), and especially Polyporus radicatus. Larval food species of lesser importance are the deer mushroom (Pluteus cervinus) of the Agaricales family Pluteaceae, and at least one bolete species (Boletaceae: Boletales) formerly placed in genus "Boletus" s.l., which like "Polyporus" s.l. has since been split up.
