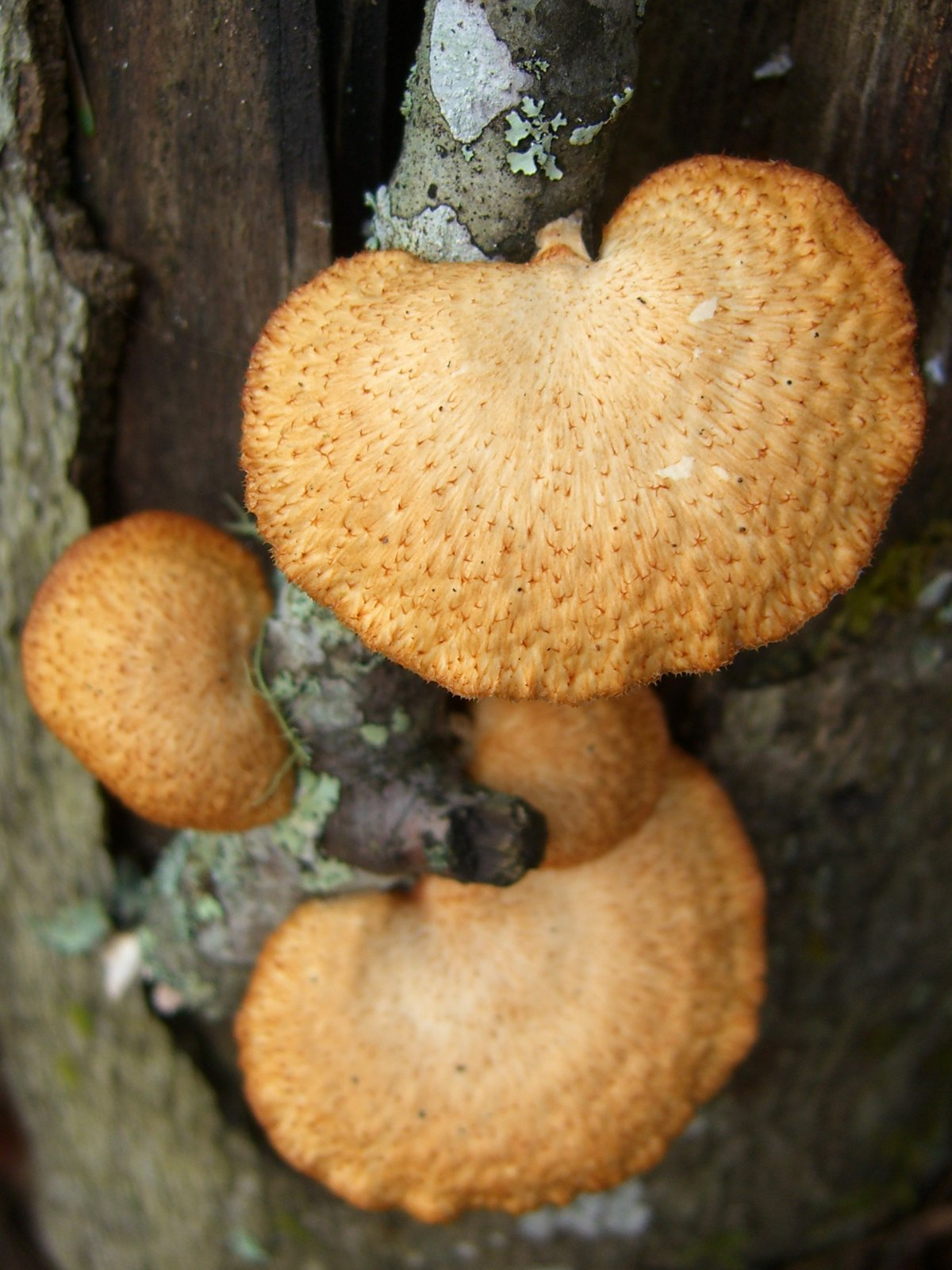

Scientific classification
- Kingdom: Fungi
- Division: Basidiomycota
- Class: Agaricomycetes
- Order: Polyporales
- Family: Polyporaceae
- Genus: Neofavolus
- Species: N. alveolaris

Binomial name
- Neofavolus alveolaris (DC.) Sotome & T. Hatt. (2012)

Synonyms
- List: Merulius alveolaris DC. (1815); Boletus mori (Pollini) Pollini (1816); Hexagonia mori Pollini (1816); Cantharellus alveolaris (DC.) Fr. (1821); Daedalea broussonetiae Cappelli (1821); Polyporus mori (Pollini) Fr. (1821); Favolus extratropicus Fr. (1825); Favolus mori (Pollini) Fr. (1825); Favolus canadensis Klotzsch (1832); Favolus europaeus Fr. (1838); Favolus ohioensis Mont. (1856); Polyporus favoloides Doass. & Pat. (1880); Favolus alveolaris (DC.) Quél. (1883); Favolus striatulus Ellis & Everh. (1897); Hexagonia alveolaris (DC.) Murrill (1904); Hexagonia micropora Murrill (1904); Favolus microporus (Murrill) Sacc. & D.Sacc. (1905); Hexagonia striatula (Ellis & Everh.) Murrill (1907); Favolus kauffmanii Lloyd (1916); Favolus whetstonei Lloyd (1916); Favolus peponinus Lloyd (1917); Polyporellus alveolaris (DC.) Pilát (1936); Polyporus alveolaris Bondartsev & Singer; Polyporus tenuiparies Laferr. & Gilb. (1990)

= Neofavolus alveolaris =

Neofavolus alveolaris
- Mycological characteristics
- Pores on hymenium
- Cap is offset
- Hymenium is decurrent
- Stipe is bare
- Spore print is white
- Ecology is saprotrophic
- Edibility is edible or inedible

Neofavolus alveolaris, commonly known as the hexagonal-pored polypore, is a species of fungus in the family Polyporaceae. It causes a white rot of dead hardwoods. Found on sticks and decaying logs, its distinguishing features are its yellowish to orange scaly cap, and the hexagonal or diamond-shaped pores. It is found in Eurasia and Australia; once thought to be widely distributed in North America, these specimens may belong to Neofavolus americanus.

== Taxonomy ==
The first scientific description of the fungus was published in 1815 by Augustin Pyramus de Candolle, under the name Merulius alveolaris. In 1821, it was sanctioned by Elias Magnus Fries as Cantharellus alveolaris. It was transferred to the genus Polyporus in a 1941 publication by Appollinaris Semenovich Bondartsev and Rolf Singer. It was transferred to its current genus in 2012.

The genus name is derived from the Greek meaning "many pores", while the specific epithet alveolaris means "with small pits or hollows".

== Description ==
The kidney-shaped caps are cream with reddish scales, measuring 1.5–6 cm (1/2–2 1/2 in) across and 5–10 millimetres (1/4–1/2 in) thick near the base; the light flesh hardens with age. The whitish stipe widens into the cap, measuring 0.5–1 cm long and 3–7 mm thick. The pores are whitish, maturing to yellow, and cover the stipe (decurrent); they are 0.5–3 mm across and rectangular to hexagonal, being rounder near the margin. The spore print is white.

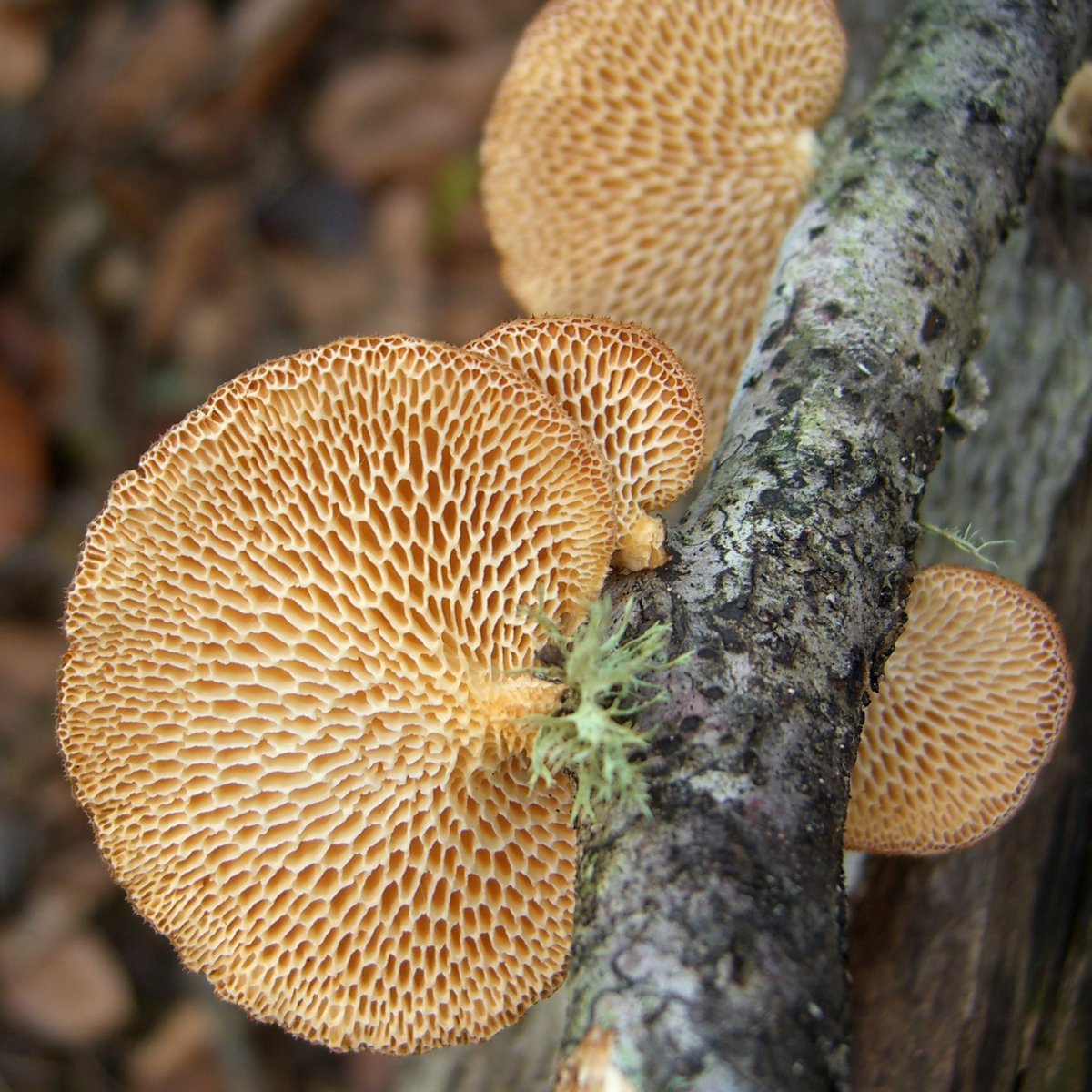
Pores on the stipe

=== Microscopic features ===
The spores are narrowly elliptical and smooth, hyaline, with dimensions of 11–14.5 × 4–5 μm. The basidia are club-shaped and four-spored, with dimensions of 28–42 × 7–9 μm.

=== Similar species ===
North American specimens may be Neofavolus americanus, with DNA sequencing possibly the only method of distinction.

Polyporus craterellus bears a resemblance to P. alveolaris, but the former species has a more prominent stalk and does not have the reddish-orange colors observed in the latter. Polyporus mcmurphyi and related species have larger caps and a more defined stem. Favolus brasiliensis lacks orange tones and Cerioporus squamosus is larger.

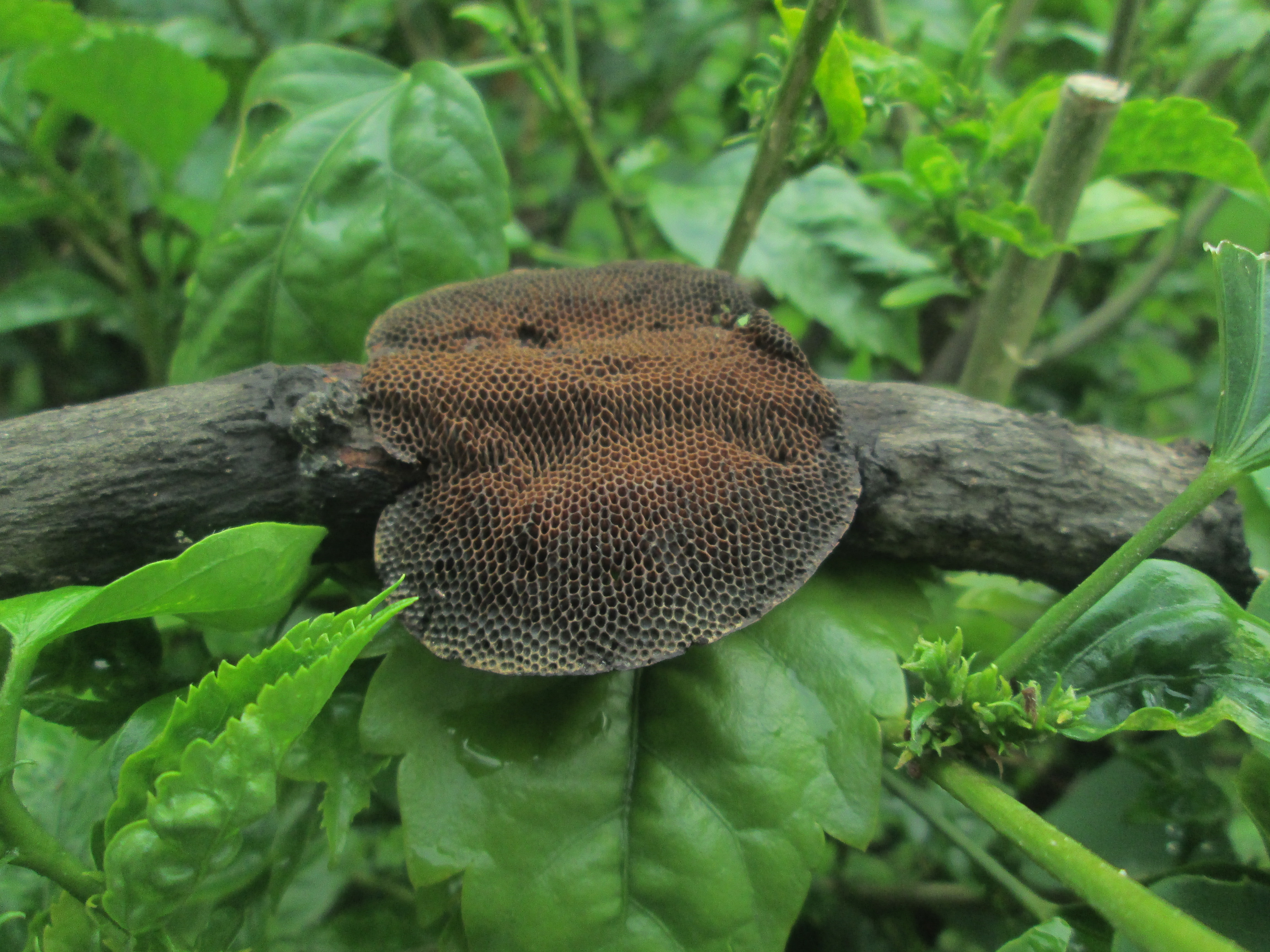
Image of Polyporus Alveolaris growing on a twig

== Distribution and ecology ==
This species has been collected in Europe (Czechoslovakia, Italy, and Portugal), China, and Australia. It was once thought to be widely distributed in eastern North America, but these specimens may belong to N. americanus.

Neofavolus alveolaris is found growing singly or grouped together on branches and twigs of hardwoods, commonly on shagbark hickory in the spring and early summer. It has been reported growing on the dead hardwoods of genera Acer, Castanea, Cornus, Corylus, Crataegus, Erica, Fagus, Fraxinus, Juglans, Magnolia, Morus, Populus, Pyrus, Robinia, Quercus, Syringa, Tilia, and Ulmus.

This species has been recorded as a favorite food of the larvae of the pleasing fungus beetle Tritoma mimetica, and of the adults and possibly also the larvae of the related Rotitma sanguinipennis. Since these beetles are only found in North America, the Neofavolus in question would rather be N.americanus if this is split from N.alveolaris. Adults of the related T.atriventris and T.humeralis (which may be conspecific) have also been found on N.alveolaris (or N.americanus), but for these beetle species it does not seem to be a regular food source.

== Uses ==
This mushroom is edible when young. It has been described as "edible but tough", with toughness increasing with age, and not having "all that distinctive of a flavor". Another reference lists the species as inedible.

A polypeptide with antifungal properties has been isolated from the fresh fruit bodies of this species. Named alveolarin, it inhibits the growth of the species Botrytis cinerea, Fusarium oxysporum, Mycosphaerella arachidicola, and Physalospora piricola.
