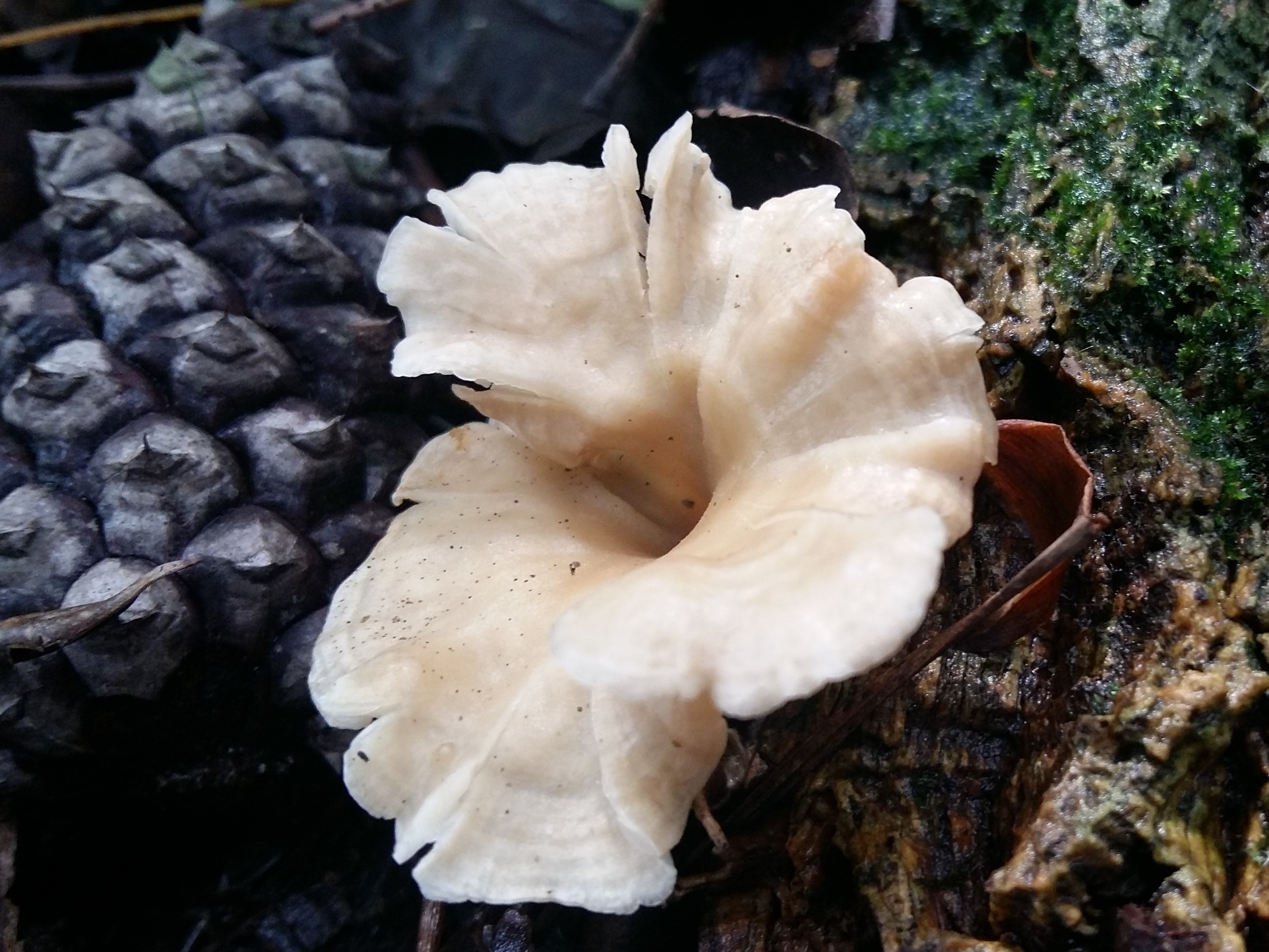

Scientific classification
- Domain: Eukaryota
- Kingdom: Fungi
- Division: Basidiomycota
- Class: Agaricomycetes
- Order: Polyporales
- Family: Polyporaceae
- Genus: Picipes
- Species: P. melanopus

Binomial name
- Picipes melanopus (Pers.) Zmitr. & Kovalenko (2016)

Synonyms
- Polyporus melanopus (Pers.) Fr. 1821

= Picipes melanopus =

Species of mushroom

Picipes melanopus is a species of mushroom in the family Polyporaceae. It can be found growing on dead wood, or from a submerged sclerotium, from spring through fall.

== Description ==
Picipes melanopus has a brown velvety cap which grows up to 10 cm across. It is centrally depressed, and has tough flesh. The stipe has a soft black felt covering. The species is inedible.

Species with a similar appearance include Picipes badius, Cerioporus leptocephalus, and Cerioporus varius. All three also have a black felt on the stipe, but only on the lower half for the latter two. P. badius has no clamp connections. Also similar are Polyporus tuberaster and Jahnoporus hirtus, the latter of which has a gray-brown cap.
