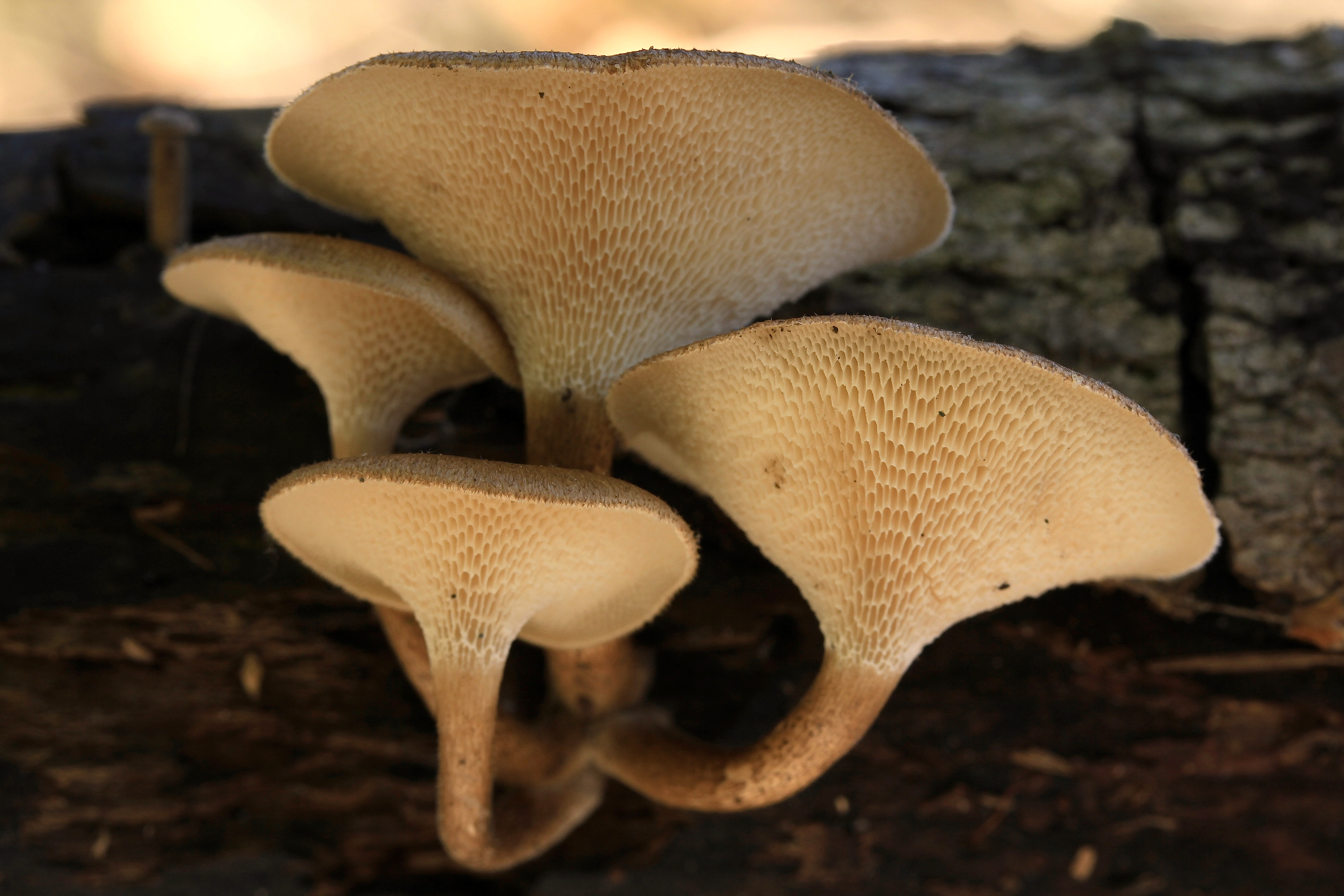

Scientific classification
- Kingdom: Fungi
- Division: Basidiomycota
- Class: Agaricomycetes
- Order: Polyporales
- Family: Polyporaceae
- Genus: Lentinus
- Species: L. arcularius

Binomial name
- Lentinus arcularius (Batsch) Zmitr. 2010

Synonyms
- Polyporus arcularius (Batsch) Fries 1821

= Lentinus arcularius =

Species of inedible fungus in the genus Polyporus

Lentinus arcularius
- Mycological characteristics
- Pores on hymenium
- Cap is convex or depressed
- Hymenium is decurrent
- Stipe is bare
- Spore print is cream to white
- Ecology is saprotrophic
- Edibility is inedible

Lentinus arcularius, also known as the spring polypore, is a ubiquitous species of fungus in the family Polyporaceae.

== Taxonomy ==
It was first documented in 1783 by German naturalist August Batsch under the name Boletus arcularius. It was later renamed to Polyporus arcularius in 1821 by Swedish mycologist Elias Magnus Fries before being recently (2010) transferred to the genus Lentinus.

== Description ==
The cap is 1–8 centimetres (1/2–3 1/4 in) in diameter and convex to depressed in shape. It is pale tan to dark brown and may have small scales, while the margin has fine hairs. The hymenium is decurrent, has hexagonal pores, and is cream to brown in color. The stipe is central, bare, scaly, and brownish. The odor is not distinct. The spore print is cream to white.

It is too small and tough to be of culinary interest.

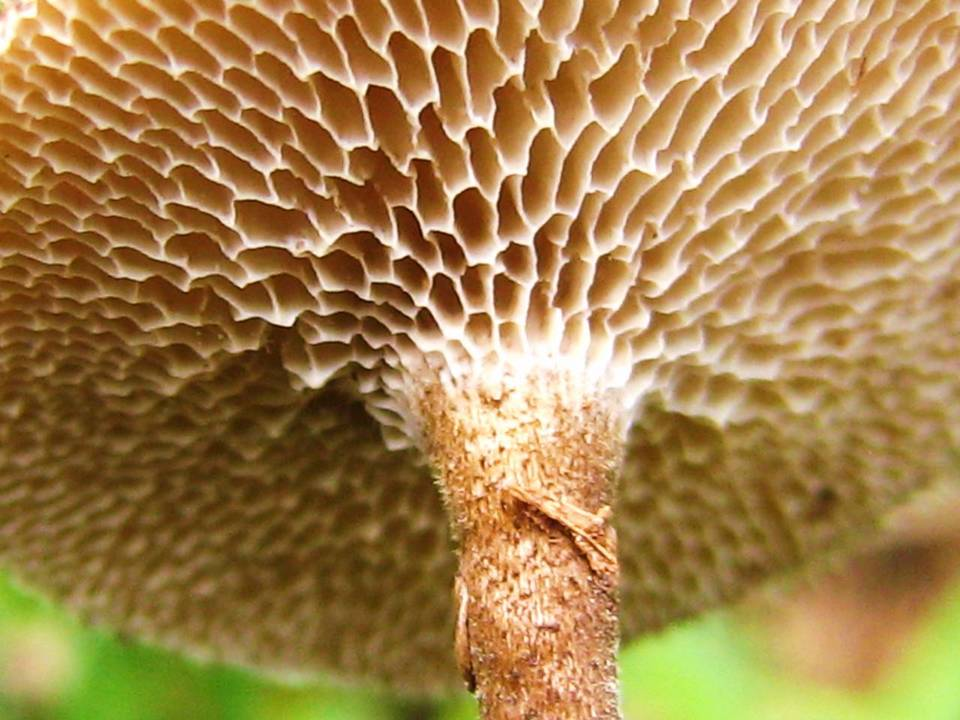
Pores on underside

== Distribution and ecology ==
It has been found on all continents, but has primarily been documented in the United States, Austria, Mexico, Australia, and Japan.

This species has been recorded as a favored food of the pleasing fungus beetles Tritoma atriventris and T.humeralis (which are often found together on the same fungus and may be conspecific), as well as the related Rotitma sanguinipennis.
