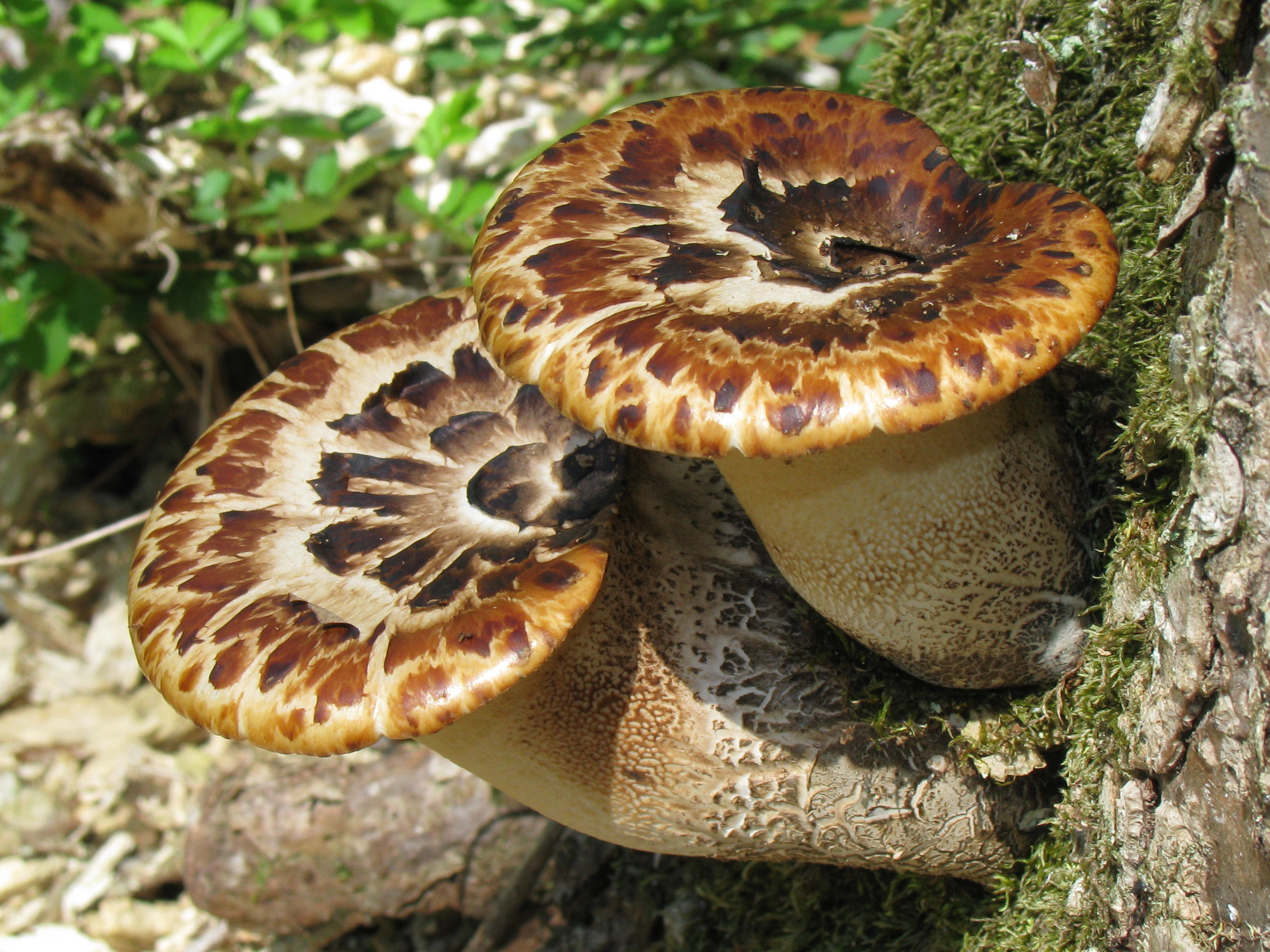

Scientific classification
- Kingdom: Fungi
- Division: Basidiomycota
- Class: Agaricomycetes
- Order: Polyporales
- Family: Polyporaceae
- Genus: Cerioporus
- Species: C. squamosus

Binomial name
- Cerioporus squamosus (Huds.) Quélet (1886)

Synonyms
- Polyporus squamosus Species synonymy: Agarico-pulpa ulmi Paulet; Boletus cellulosus Lightf.; Boletus juglandis Schaeff.; Boletus maximus Schumach.; Boletus michelii (Fr.) Pollini; Boletus polymorphus Bull.; Boletus rangiferinus Bolton; Boletus squamosus Huds.; Bresadolia caucasica Shestunov; Bresadolia paradoxa Speg.; Bresadolia squamosa (Huds.) Teixeira; Cerioporus michelii (Fr.) Quél.; Cerioporus rostkowii (Fr.) Quél.; Favolus squamosus (Huds.) Ames; Melanopus squamosus (Huds.) Pat.; Polyporellus rostkowii (Fr.) P. Karst.; Polyporellus squamatus (Lloyd) Pilát; Polyporellus squamosus (Huds.) P. Karst.; Polyporellus squamosus f. rostkowii (Fr.) Pilát; Polyporus alpinus Saut.; Polyporus caudicinus Murrill; Polyporus dissectus Letell.; Polyporus flabelliformis Pers.; Polyporus flabelliformis Pers.; Polyporus infundibuliformis Rostk.; Polyporus juglandis (Schaeff.) Pers.; Polyporus michelii Fr.; Polyporus pallidus Schulzer; Polyporus retirugis (Bres.) Ryvarden; Polyporus rostkowii Fr.; Polyporus squamosus (Huds.) Quél.; Polyporus squamatus Lloyd; Polyporus squamosus f. michelii (Fr.) Bondartsev; Polyporus squamosus f. rostkowii (Fr.) Bondartsev; Polyporus squamosus var. maculatus Velen.; Polyporus squamosus var. polymorphus (Bull.) P.W. Graff; Polyporus ulmi Paulet; Polyporus westii Murrill; Trametes retirugis Bres.

= Cerioporus squamosus =

Species of fungus

Cerioporus squamosus
- Mycological characteristics
- Pores on hymenium
- Cap is depressed or offset
- Hymenium is decurrent
- Stipe is bare
- Spore print is white
- Ecology is saprotrophic or parasitic
- Edibility is edible or inedible

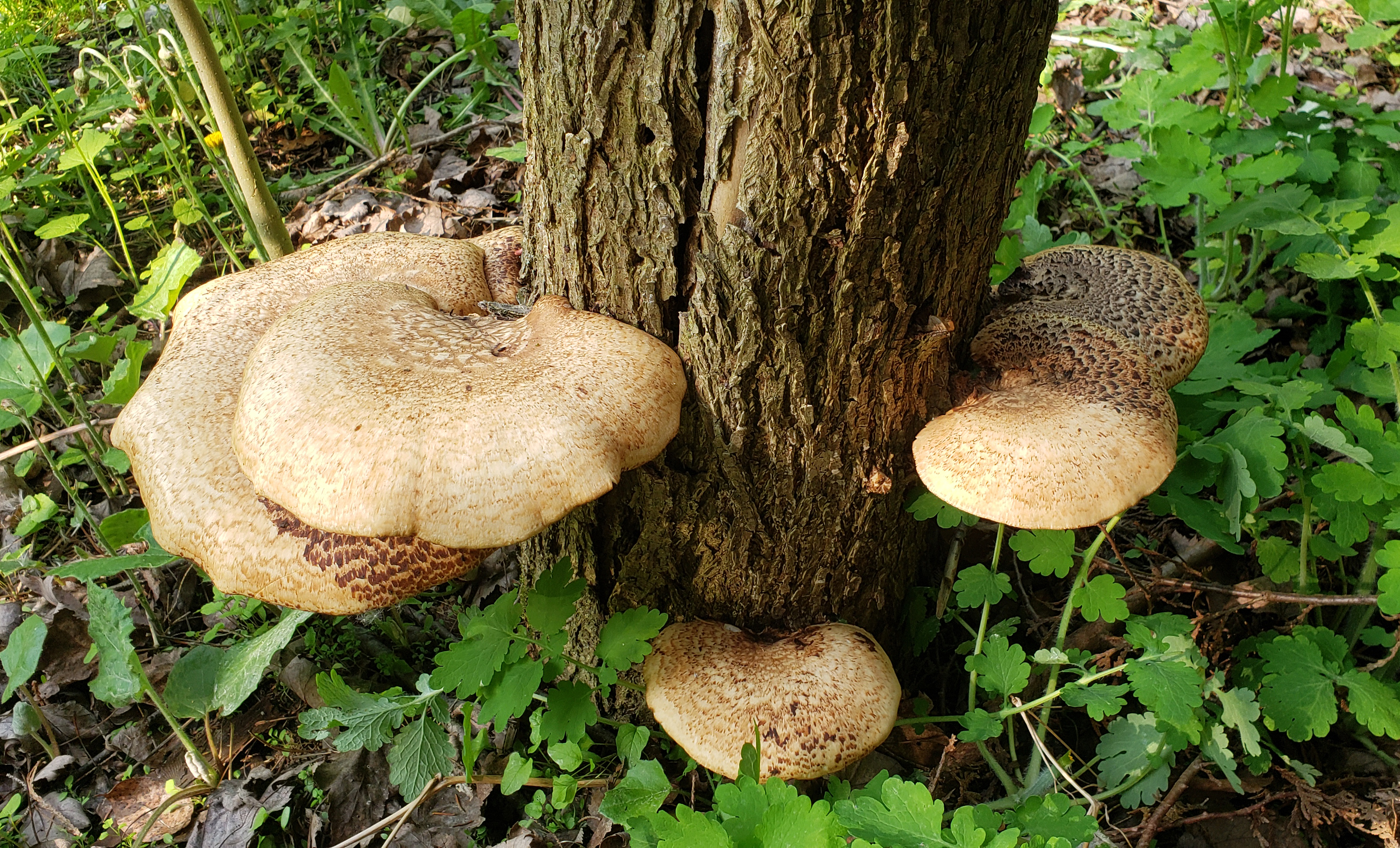
Dryad's saddle (Cerioporus squamosus)

Cerioporus squamosus, synonym Polyporus squamosus, is a basidiomycete bracket fungus, with common names including dryad's saddle and pheasant's back mushroom. It has a widespread distribution, being found in Eurasia and North America. It causes a white rot in the heartwood of living and dead hardwood trees.

== Taxonomy ==
The species was first described scientifically by British botanist William Hudson in 1778, who named it Boletus squamosus. It was given its current name in 1886 by Lucien Quélet but is still widely known by the Elias Magnus Fries name Polyporus squamosus.

=== Etymology ===
Squamosus comes from the Latin squamosus meaning covered with scales or scaly, referring to the signature dark brown scales found on the mushroom's cap.

The name "dryad's saddle" refers to creatures in Greek mythology called dryads who could conceivably sit and rest on this mushroom, whereas the pheasant's back analogy derives from the pattern of colors on the bracket matching that of a pheasant's back.

== Description ==
Dryad's saddle is an annual mushroom commonly found attached to dead logs and stumps or on living hardwood trees at one point with a thick stem. Generally, the fruit body is round and between 8–30 centimetres (3–12 inches) across – exceptionally 60 cm (24 in) – and up to 10 cm (4 in) thick. The body can be yellow to brown and has "squamules" or scales on its upper side. On the underside one can see the pores that are characteristic of the genus Cerioporus; they are made up of tubes packed together closely. The tubes are between 1 and 12 mm (1/16 and 1/2 in) long. The stalk is 3–12 cm (1–4 1/2 in) long and 1.5–3.5 cm (1/2–1 1/2 in) thick. The mushroom's smell resembles that of watermelon rind.

The fruit body produces a white spore print. The spores are 11–15 x 4–5 μm and are long and smooth ellipsoids. They can be found alone, in clusters of two or three, or forming shelves. Young specimens are soft but toughen with age. It is particularly common on dead elm and is also found on living maple trees. The fruit bodies, or "shelves" can grow rapidly. One studied by pioneer botanist Sir William J. Hooker at Dalbeth, Scotland in 1810 grew to a circumference of 2.3 m (7 ft 7 in) and a weight of 15.5 kg (34 lb) in four weeks.

=== Similar species ===
In Polyporus tuberaster, the cap is rounder and the stipe more central, with the scales only dark at the tip.

== Distribution and ecology ==
The species is common and widespread, being found over much of Europe (July–November) and east of the Rocky Mountains in the United States (April–October). It is also found in Asia and Australia. It commonly fruits in the spring, occasionally during autumn, and rarely during other seasons. Many mushroom hunters stumble upon this substantially sized mushroom when looking for morels during the spring, as both have similar fruiting times.

As a white rot fungus, it plays an important role in woodland ecosystems by decomposing wood, usually elm or maple, but is occasionally a parasite on living trees. Other tree hosts include ash, beech, horse-chestnut, Persian walnut, lime, maple, plane, poplar, magnolia, and willow.

This species has been recorded as a favored food of the pleasing fungus beetles Dacne quadrimaculata and Tritoma humeralis; it is also often eaten by the larvae of Tritoma mimetica, while adults of that species generally seem to avoid it. In addition, adults of the related Aporotritoma pulchra and Rotitma sanguinipennis have been recorded from C.squamosus, but it does not seem to be a regular food source for them.

== Uses ==
The species is edible when young and cooked. Specimens can become infested with maggots and become firm, rubbery and inedible as they mature. Cookbooks dealing with preparation generally recommend gathering these while young, slicing them into small pieces and cooking them over a low heat.

Some people value the thick, stiff paper that can be made from this and many other mushrooms of the genus Cerioporus.

== Gallery ==
Polyporus squamosus

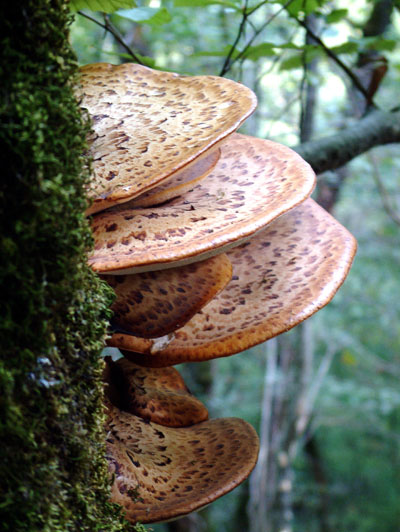
Forming "shelves" on the side of a tree

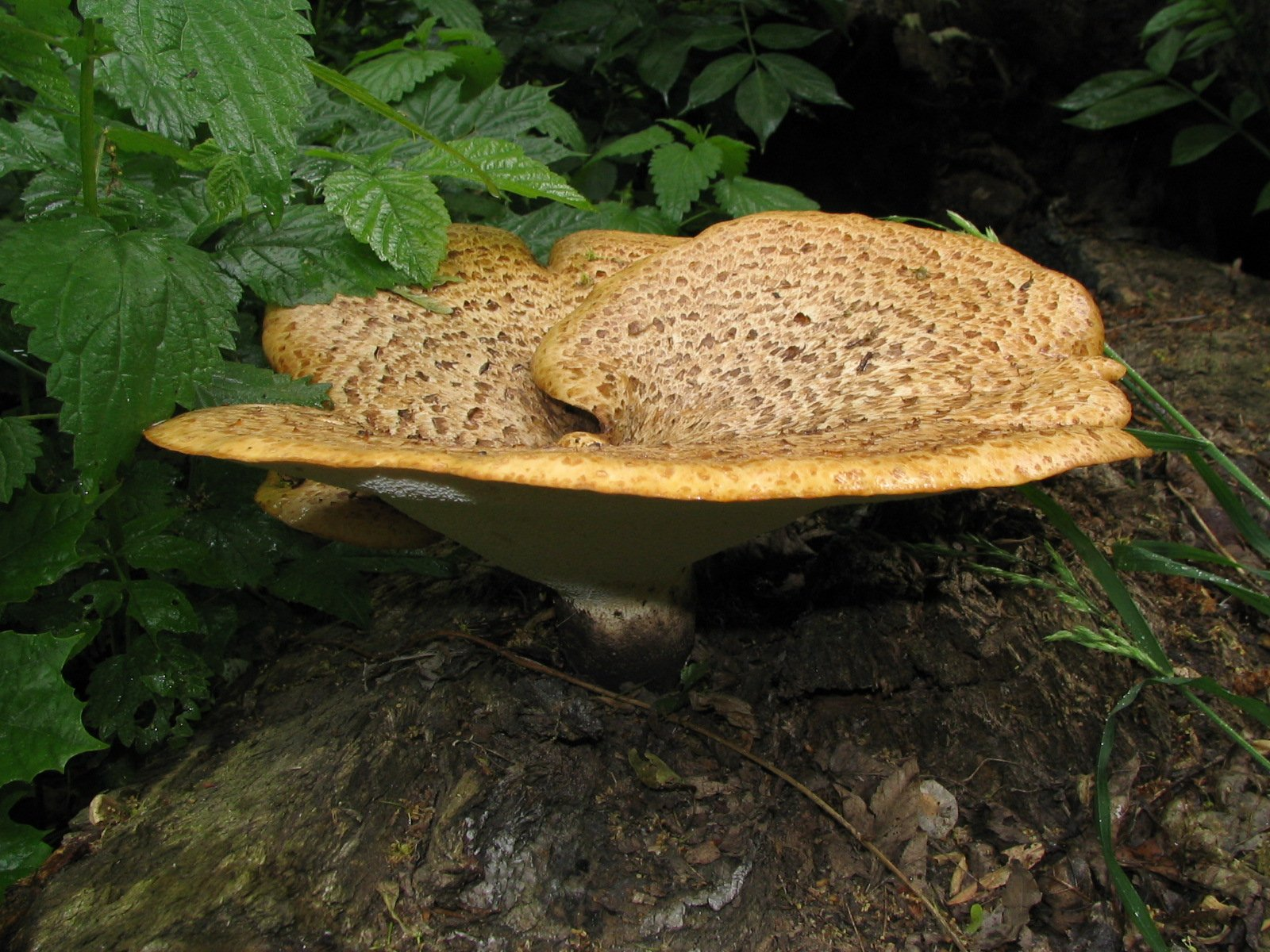
Growing on ground

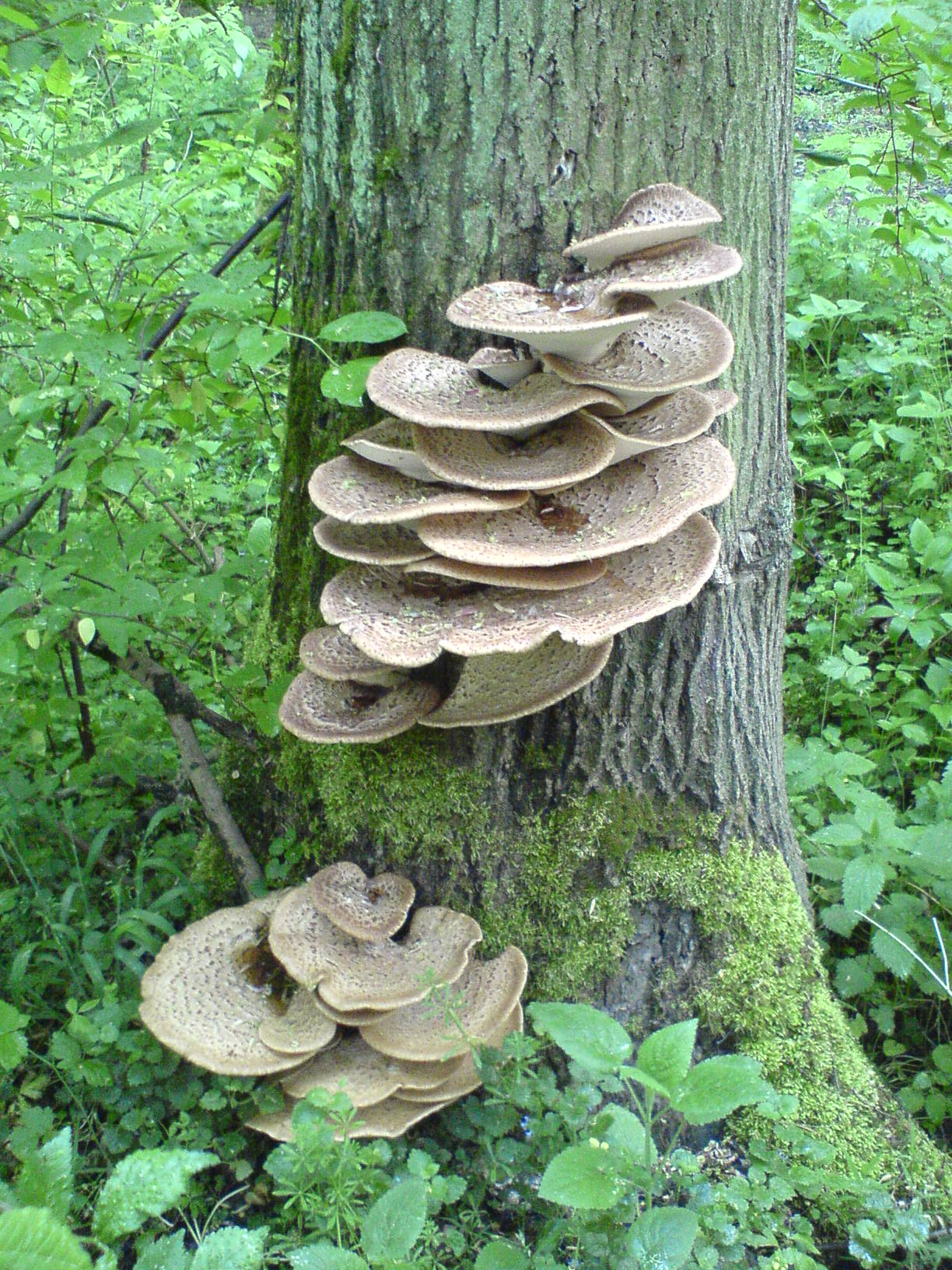
Shelf growing on tree

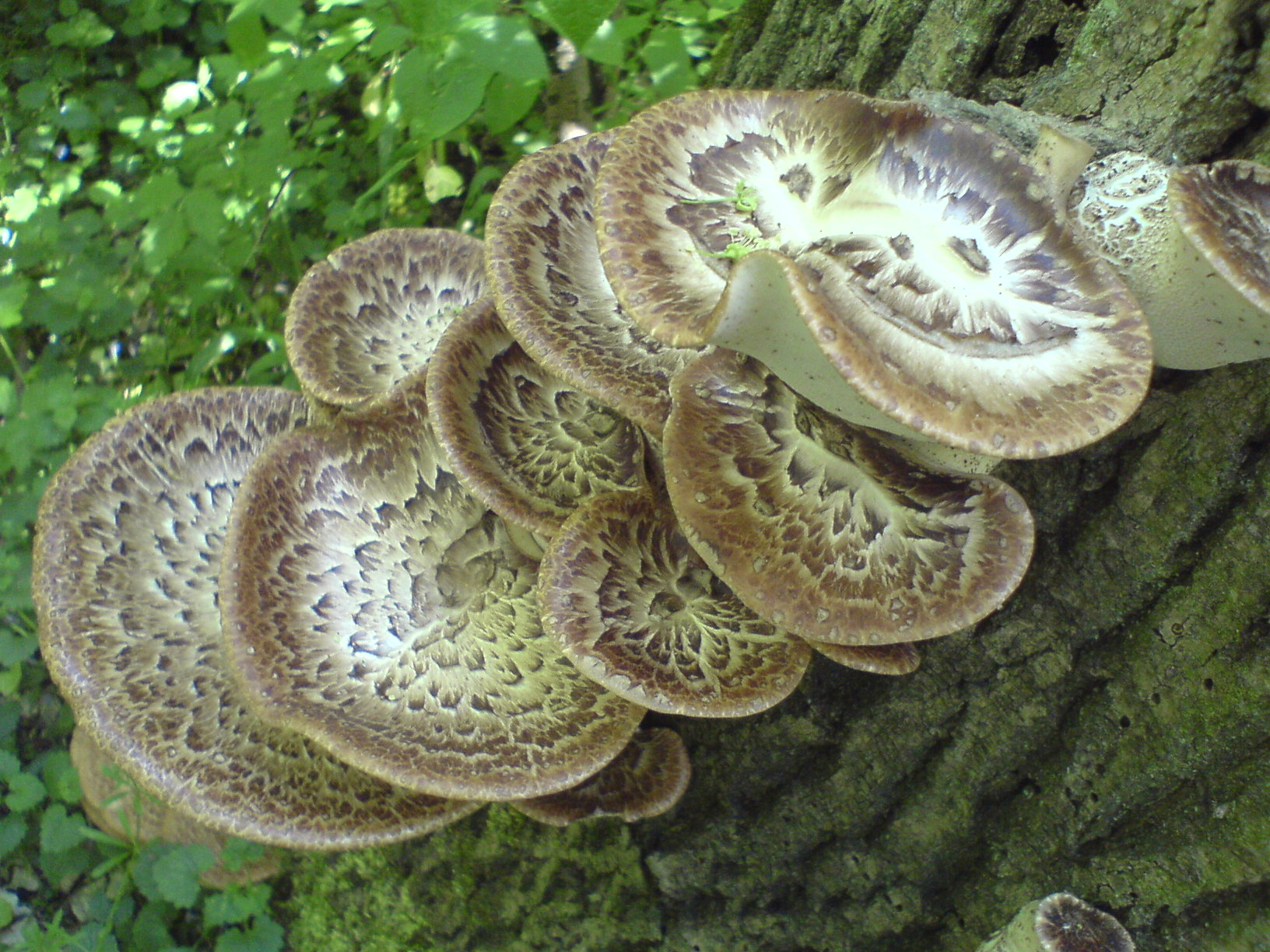
Bird's eye view of shelf

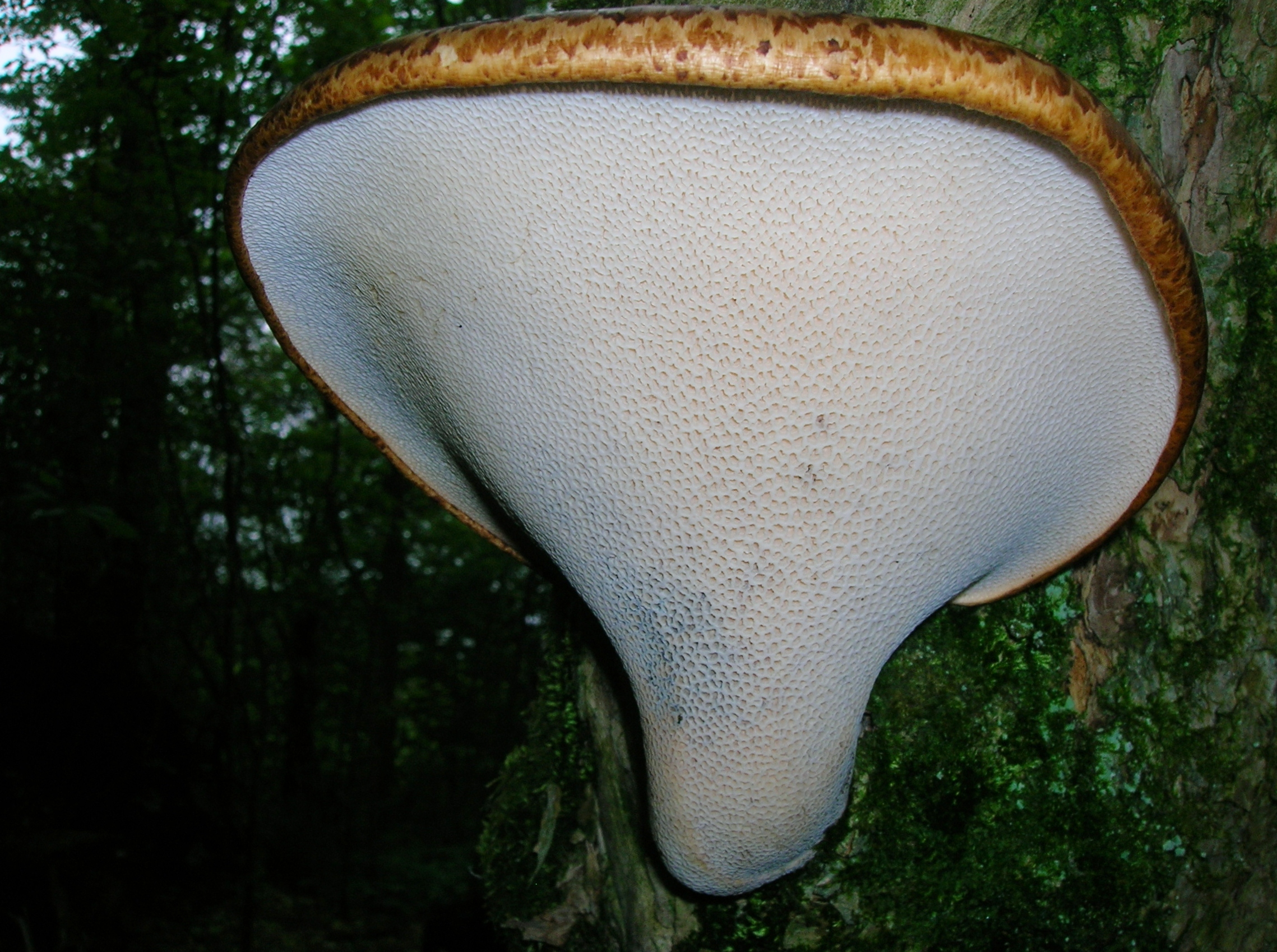
Growing on an elder (Sambucus nigra) in Scotland

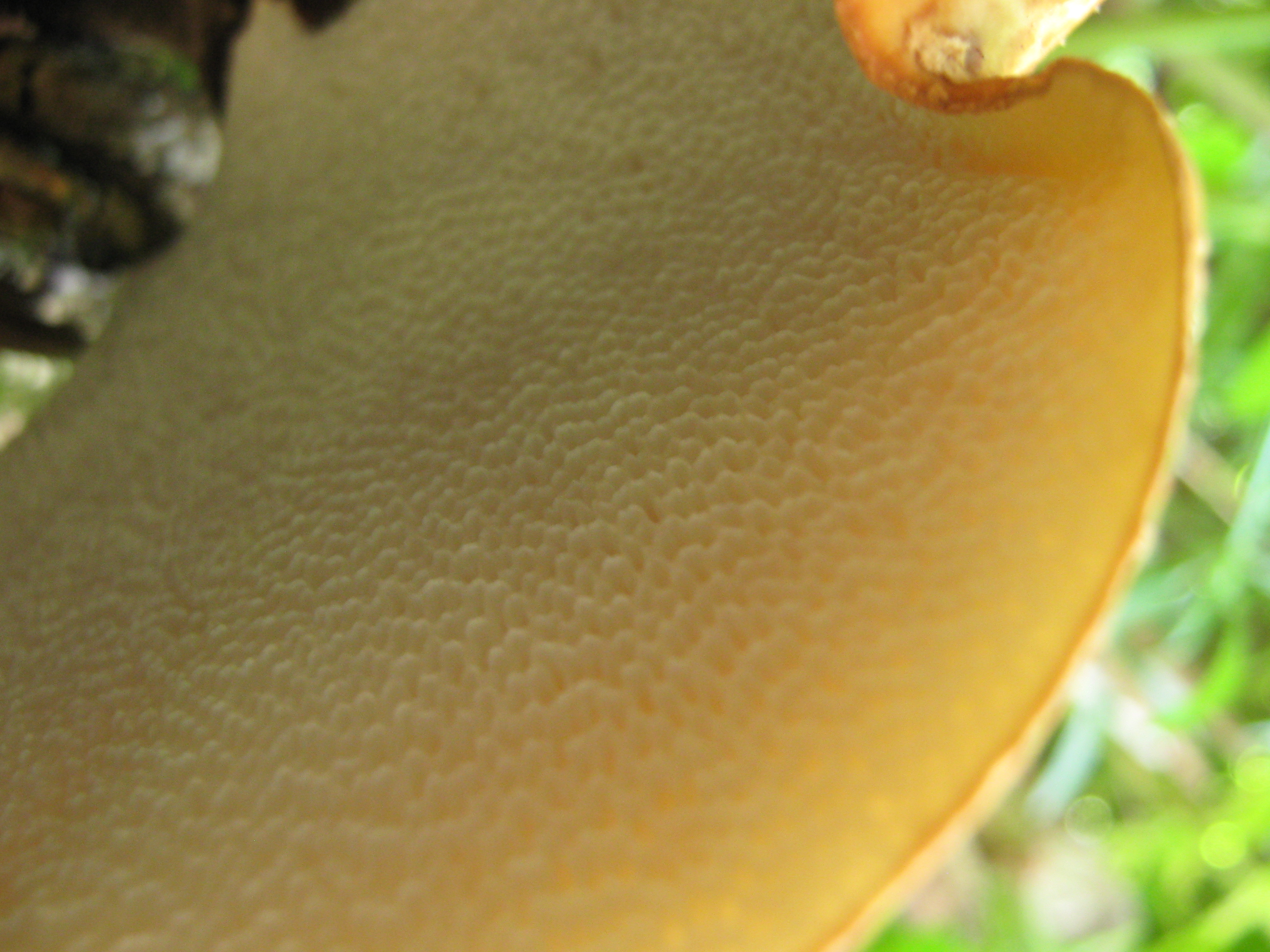
Pores

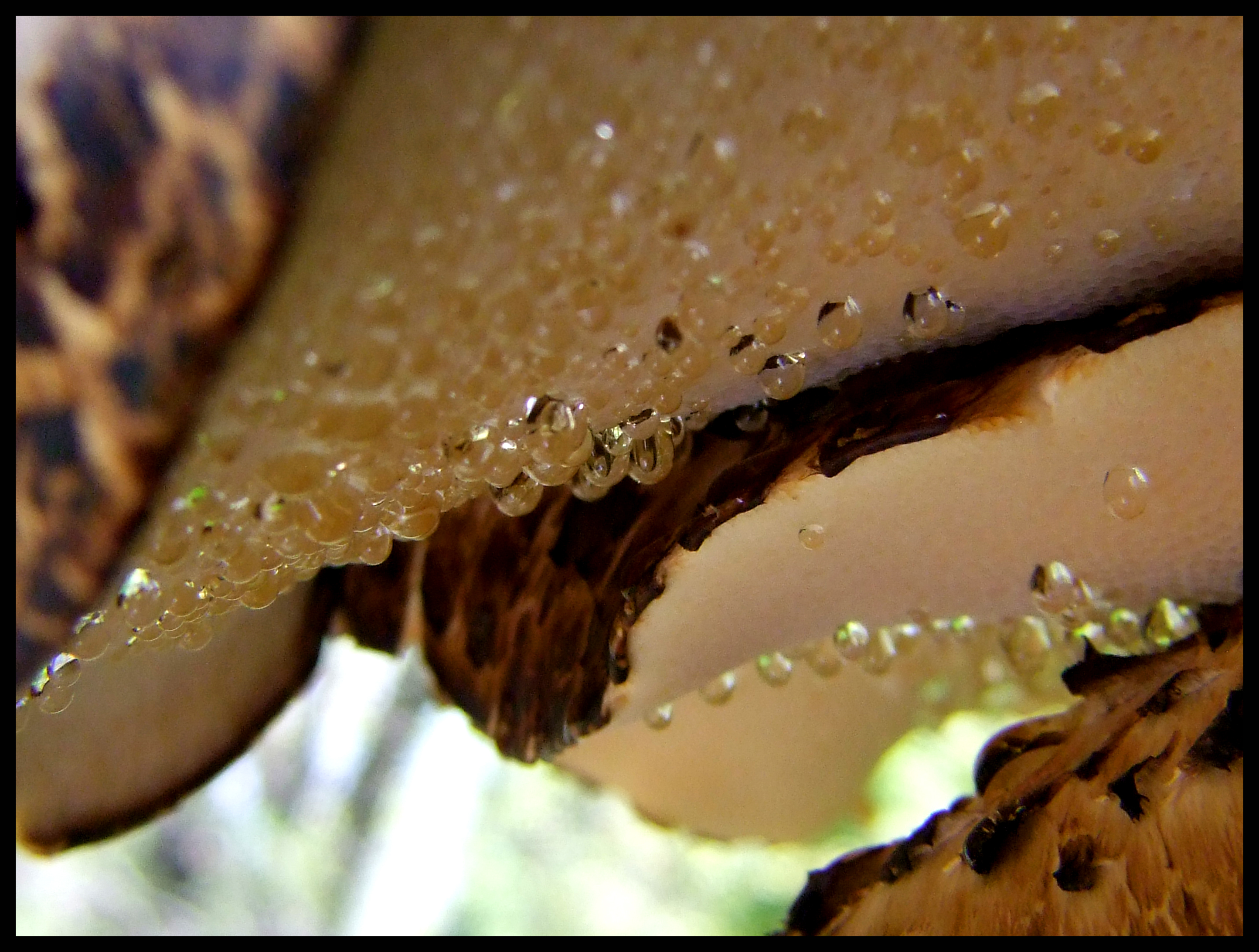
Secretion

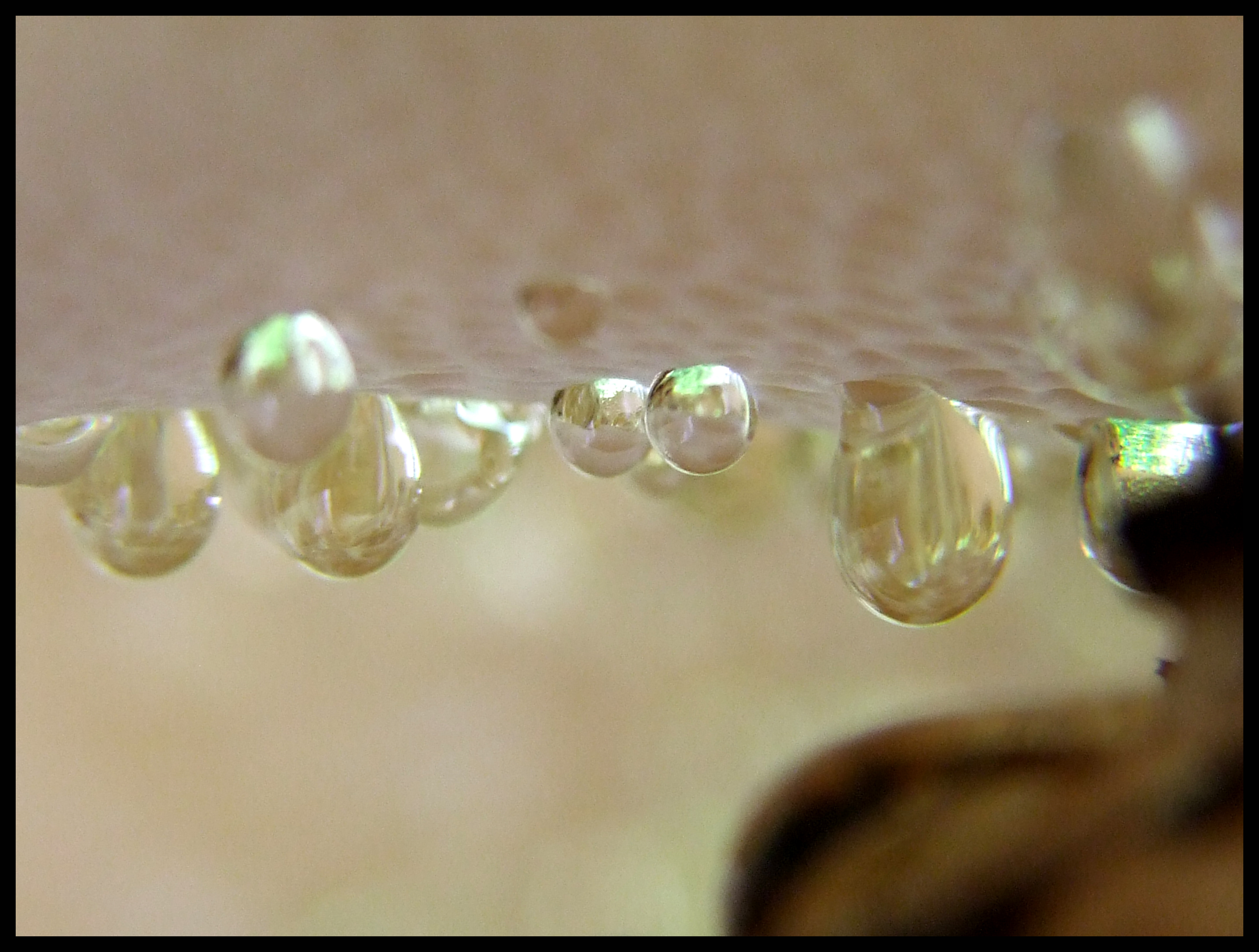
Close-up of secretion
