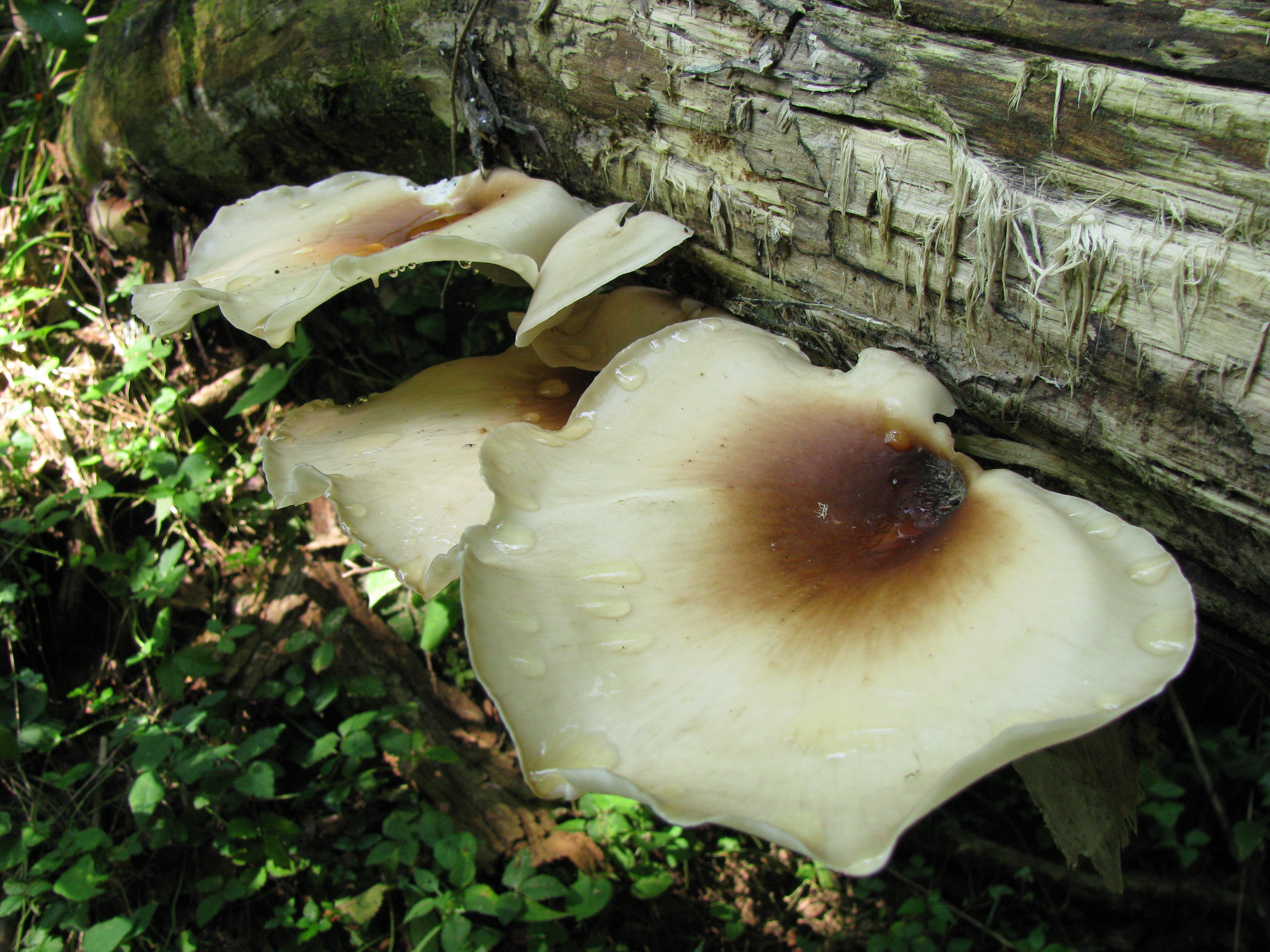
- Specimens showing light coloring (above) and darker pigmentation (below) a few days later
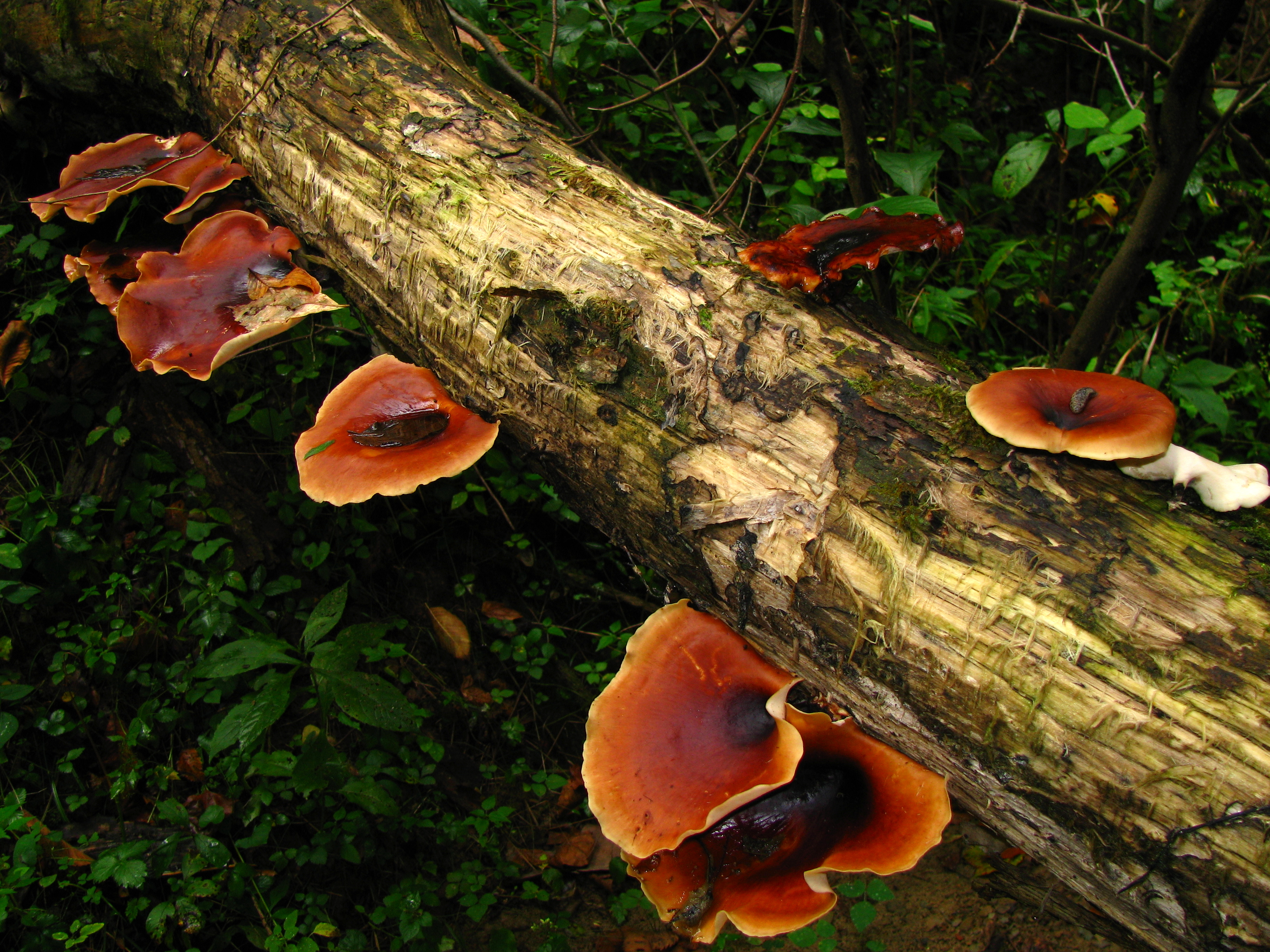

Scientific classification
- Kingdom: Fungi
- Division: Basidiomycota
- Class: Agaricomycetes
- Order: Polyporales
- Family: Polyporaceae
- Genus: Picipes
- Species: P. badius

Binomial name
- Picipes badius (Pers.) Zmitr. & Kovalenko (2016)

Synonyms
- List: Boletus durus Timm (1788); Boletus batschii J.F.Gmel. (1792); Boletus badius Pers. (1801); Grifola badia (Pers.) Gray (1821); Polyporus badius (Pers.) Schwein. (1832); Polyporus picipes Fr. (1838); Polyporus durus (Timm) Kreisel (1984); Polyporellus badius (Pers.) Imazeki (1989); Royoporus badius (Pers.) De (1997)

= Picipes badius =

Species of fungus

Picipes badius
- Mycological characteristics
- Pores on hymenium
- Cap is convex or umbilicate
- Stipe is bare
- Spore print is white
- Ecology is saprotrophic
- Edibility is inedible

Picipes badius (formerly Royoporus badius), commonly known as the black-footed polypore or black-leg, is a species of fungus in the family Polyporaceae. It has a dark brown or reddish-brown cap that reaches a diameter of 25 cm (10 in), and a stipe that is often completely black or brown at the top and black at the base. It causes a white rot of hardwoods and conifers in temperate areas of Eurasia and North America.

== Taxonomy ==
The species was first described in the scientific literature in 1801 by Christian Hendrik Persoon, who named it Boletus badius. American mycologist Lewis David de Schweinitz transferred the species to Polyporus in 1832, and it was known by this name until 1997, when De transferred the species into the genus Royoporus, which he had described the year before.

Polyporaceae species that are closely phylogenetically related to Picipes badius include Polyporus dictyopus, Polyporus melanopus, and Polyporus tubaeformis, which have clamp connections on generative hyphae and a similar ecology. Zmitrovich & Kovalenko proposed the new genus Picipes for this fungus together with P. melanopus and P. tubaeformis; according to Species Fungorum, Picipes badius is the correct current name.

The specific epithet badius derives from the Latin root badi-, meaning "reddish brown". The common names "black-footed polypore" and "black-leg" refer to its characteristic dark-colored stipe.

== Description ==
The fruit bodies tend to be upright, growing solitary or in groups, sometimes with two or more fruit bodies arising from a common stipe. The cap is circular or kidney-shaped, and often lobed or with a wavy edge.

When young, the fruit bodies are convex, then become flat or funnel-shaped in maturity, reaching dimensions of 4–25 cm (1 1/2–10 in) across by 1–4 mm (0.04–0.16 in) thick. The upper cap surface is smooth and glossy, but develops radial wrinkles as it ages. The color of the cap is brown, often darker in the center and lighter-colored at the margins; it may blacken with age.

The under-surface is white or cream-colored, yellowing when old. The pores are round and number 4–8 per mm, while the shallow tubes are adnate to decurrent (running down the length of the stipe). The stipe, attached to the cap either centrally or laterally, is 1–8 cm (1/2–3 1/4 in) long by 0.3–1.5 cm (0–1/2 in) thick, velvety and dark brown to blackish-brown, black and longitudinally wrinkled when old. The fruit bodies are inedible because of their tough texture.

The spores are ellipsoid or cylindrical, hyaline (translucent), smooth, and 7.5–9 by 3–5 μm. The basidia (spore-bearing cells) are club-shaped with a narrow base, and have dimensions of 20–30 by 7–9 μm. Like other members of the genus Polyporus, this species has a dimitic hyphal construction, meaning that the hyphae are made of both generative hyphae and skeleto-ligative hyphae, a feature which tends to make the mushroom tissue hard and woody. There are no cystidia in the hymenium. The fungus has been shown to produce asexual spores when grown in pure culture conditions.

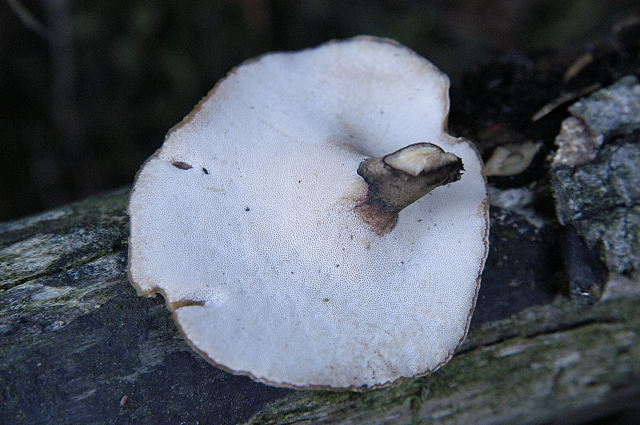
Underside and blackish stipe

== Distribution and ecology ==
Picipes badius grows in temperate regions of Asia, Europe, and North America. It grows on the standing or fallen trunks and branches of various hardwood genera, including Acer, Aesculus, Alnus, Betula, Castanea, Fagus, Fraxinus, Populus, Prunus, Robinia, Quercus, Salix, Tilia and Ulmus. This fungus is a saprobic species, and causes white rot.

Adults of the pleasing fungus beetle Rotitma sanguinipennis have been recorded from this fungus, but it does not seem to be a regular food source for them.
