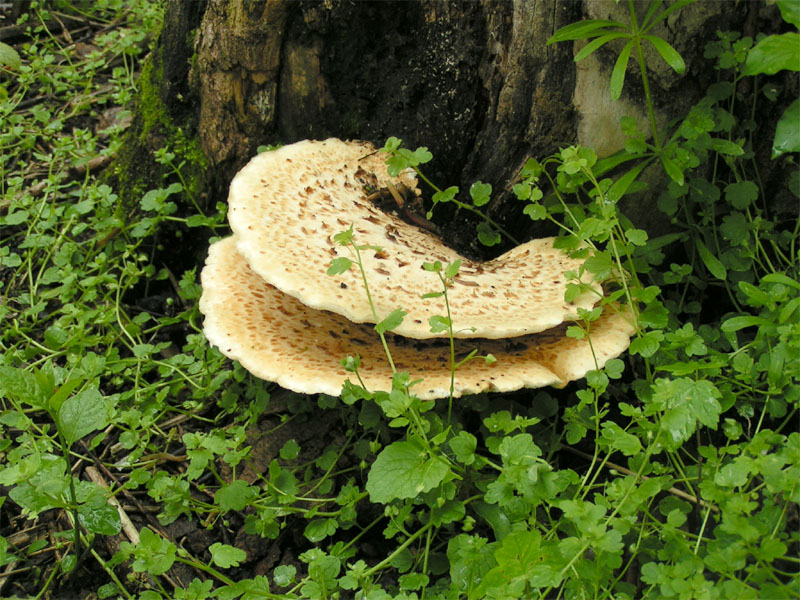
- Cerioporus squamosus

Scientific classification
- Domain: Eukaryota
- Kingdom: Fungi
- Division: Basidiomycota
- Class: Agaricomycetes
- Order: Polyporales
- Family: Polyporaceae
- Genus: Cerioporus; P.Micheli ex Adans. (1763)

Type species
- Cerioporus squamosus (Huds.) Quél. 1886

= Cerioporus =

Genus of fungi

Cerioporus is a genus of fungi in the family Polyporaceae. The type species is Cerioporus squamosus. Many species in Cerioporus were formerly placed in the genus Polyporus, however phylogenetic analysis shows that Cerioporus is a separate genus. It has been reported that mushrooms have significant antioxidant and antimicrobial activity.

== Structure of basidiocarp ==
The basidiocarps are tough, especially when mature. The form is polyporoid to trametoid. The spores are fusoid.

== Hyphae ==
The hyphae are dimitic, composed of binding or skeletal hyphae. The skeletal hyphae are inflated and axial.

== Species ==
- Cerioporus admirabilis
- Cerioporus choseniae
- Cerioporus corylinus
- Cerioporus hygrocybe
- Cerioporus leptocephalus
- Cerioporus meridionalis
- Cerioporus squamosus (type species)
- Cerioporus rhizophilus
- Cerioporus stereoides
- Cerioporus varius
- Cerioporus vassilievae

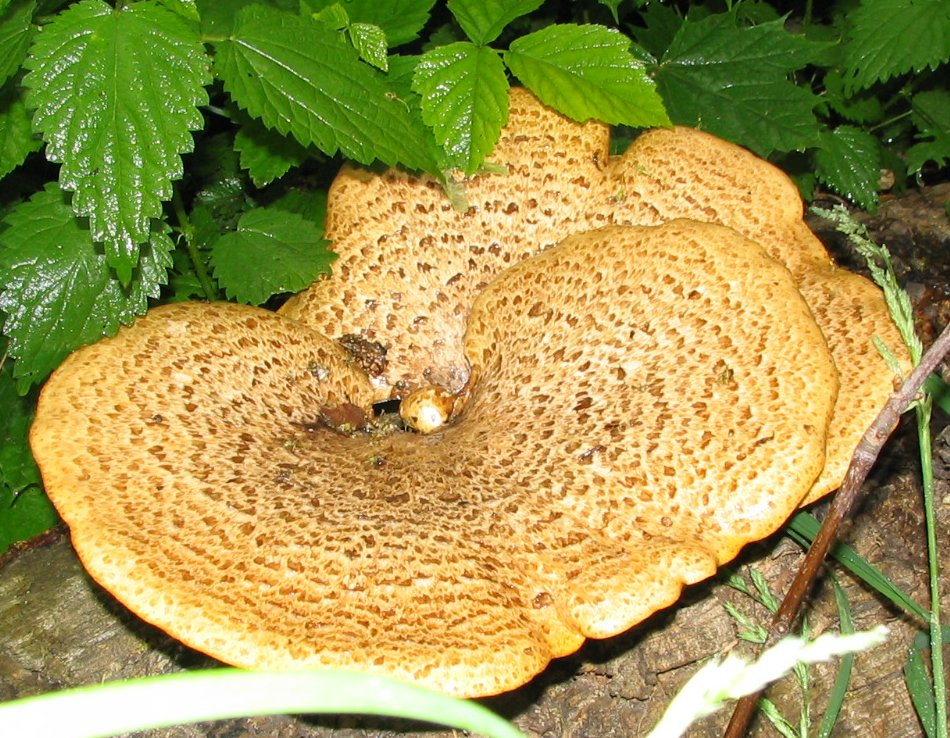
Cerioporus squamosus
