= List of Polyporus species =

This is a list of species in the genus Polyporus. As of December 2023, Index Fungorum accepts 247 species in the genus Polyporus.

A B C D E F G H I J K L M N O P Q R S T U V U W X Y Z

== A ==
- Polyporus albiceps Peck (1900)
- Polyporus albojavensis Lloyd (1924)
- Polyporus albomollis Lloyd (1924)
- Polyporus alboniger Lloyd ex G. Cunn. (1950)
- Polyporus albospongia Lloyd (1918)
- Polyporus alneus (Pers.) E.H.L. Krause (1928)
- Polyporus alutaceus Fr. (1821)
- Polyporus annulatus Jungh. (1838)
- Polyporus anthracophilus Cooke (1883)
- Polyporus antilopus (Kalchbr.) Lloyd (1912)
- Polyporus arenatus Lloyd ex Overeem & D. Overeem (1922)
- Polyporus armadillus Lloyd (1920)
- Polyporus asperulatus Lloyd (1920)
- Polyporus asperulus Har. & Pat. (1903)
- Polyporus atrannosus E.H.L. Krause (1928)
- Polyporus atromaculatus Lloyd (1922)
- Polyporus atromaculus Lloyd (1936)
- Polyporus atromarginatus Rick (1940)
- Polyporus aurantibrunneus Corner (1984)
- Polyporus aurantioporus Quanten (1996)
- Polyporus auratus B.K. Cui, Xing Ji & J.L. Zhou (2022)
- Polyporus austroafricanus Núñez & Ryvarden (1994)
- Polyporus austrosinensis B.K. Cui, Xing Ji & J.L. Zhou (2022)

== B ==
- Polyporus balloui Lloyd (1915)
- Polyporus bankeri Lloyd (1915)
- Polyporus bathiei Lloyd (1912)
- Polyporus brevibasidiosus H. Lee, N.K. Kim & Y.W. Lim (2017)
- Polyporus brittonii (Murrill) Overh. (1926)
- Polyporus brunneopapyrus Ryvarden (2019)

== C ==
- Polyporus cachoeirasensis Henn. (1904)
- Polyporus caespitosissimus Singer (1951)
- Polyporus calcuttensis Bose (1925)
- Polyporus calkinsii (Murrill) Sacc. & Trotter (1912)
- Polyporus calvatioides Imazeki (1940)
- Polyporus canescens Bres. (1914)
- Polyporus cartilaginosus Rick (1907)
- Polyporus castaneae Bourdot & Galzin (1925)
- Polyporus castanophilus G.F. Atk. (1902)
- Polyporus centroafricanus Núñez & Ryvarden (1995)
- Polyporus cerrusata Bres. (1926)
- Polyporus cervinus Pers. (1825)
- Polyporus cesatii (Berk.) Lloyd (1923)
- Polyporus changensis Rostr. (1902)
- Polyporus circulatus Velen. (1922)
- Polyporus confusus Massee (1910)
- Polyporus conifericola H.J. Xue & L.W. Zhou (2013)
- Polyporus consobrinus Speg. (1916)
- Polyporus cremeotomentosus (Henn.) Lloyd (1912)
- Polyporus croceoleucus Pat. (1924)
- Polyporus cryptomeriae (Henn.) Sacc. & Trotter (1925)
- Polyporus culmicola C. Sharp & Ryvarden (2020)
- Polyporus cuneatobrunneus (Lloyd) Teng (1934)

== D ==
- Polyporus dielsii Henn. (1903)
- Polyporus diffissus Berk. (1855)
- Polyporus distinguendus Sacc. & Trotter (1925)
- Polyporus doidgeae Wakef. (1948)
- Polyporus durbanensis Van der Byl (1922)
- Polyporus duroporus Lloyd (1920)

== E ==
- Polyporus efibulatus (A.M. Ainsw. & Ryvarden) Melo & Ryvarden (2017)
- Polyporus ehrenreichii (Henn. ex Sacc.) Sacc. & Trotter (1925)
- Polyporus eichelbaumii Henn. (1905)
- Polyporus eurystegon E.H.L. Krause (1928)
- Polyporus eylesii Van der Byl (1927)

== F ==
- Polyporus fallaciosus Speg. (1916)
- Polyporus fasciculatus (Pat.) Lloyd (1912)
- Polyporus flabellaris Lloyd (1920)
- Polyporus foeniculaceus Velen. (1922)
- Polyporus formosus Laubert (1923)
- Polyporus fraxinicola L.W. Zhou & Y.C. Dai (2013)
- Polyporus friabilis Bose (1921)
- Polyporus fumoso-olivaceus Lloyd (1919)

== G ==
- Polyporus gabonensis Decock & Ryvarden (2020)
- Polyporus garckeanus (Henn. ex Sacc.) Sacc. & Trotter (1925)
- Polyporus gayanus Lév. (1846)
- Polyporus gerardii (Berk. & M.A. Curtis ex Cooke) Rick (1960)
- Polyporus gilvorigidus Lloyd (1925)
- Polyporus gleadowii (Massee) B.K. Bakshi (1971)
- Polyporus globocephalus Lloyd (1917)
- Polyporus gloeoporoides Speg. (1916)
- Polyporus gollanii Henn. (1901)
- Polyporus goossensiae Beeli (1929)
- Polyporus gossweileri Lloyd (1918)
- Polyporus gracilisporus (H. Lee, N.K. Kim & Y.W. Lim) Bernicchia & Gorjón (2020)
- Polyporus graffianus Bres. (1915)
- Polyporus gratzianus Murrill (1945)
- Polyporus gregarius Rick (1960)
- Polyporus guianensis Mont. (1840)

== H ==
- Polyporus hariotianus Speg. (1916)
- Polyporus helopus Har. & Pat. (1904)
- Polyporus hiascens Lloyd (1922)
- Polyporus hinoi S. Ito & S. Imai (1940)
- Polyporus horaci Velen. (1922)
- Polyporus huii Lloyd (1936)
- Polyporus hunanensis Lohwag (1937)
- Polyporus hypomelanus Berk. ex Cooke (1886)
- Polyporus hypomiltinus Bres. (1937)

== I ==
- Polyporus illinoisensis D.V. Baxter (1939)
- Polyporus immaculatus Berk. ex Lloyd (1915)
- Polyporus imporcatus Lloyd (1924)
- Polyporus inaequalis Lloyd (1918)
- Polyporus incendiarius (Bong.) Fr. (1838)
- Polyporus indigenus I.J.A. Aguiar & M.A. de Sousa (1981)
- Polyporus inopinus Lloyd (1918)
- Polyporus inornatus Petch (1922)
- Polyporus introfuscus Petch (1916)
- Polyporus irpiciformis Velen. (1922)

== J ==
- Polyporus jianfenglingensis (G.Y. Zheng) H.D. Zheng & P.G. Liu (2005)

== K ==
- Polyporus koreanus H. Lee, N.K. Kim & Y.W. Lim (2017)

== L ==
- Polyporus labis Lloyd (1923)
- Polyporus laetiporoides Vlasák & Ryvarden (2020)
- Polyporus lamelliporus B.K. Cui, Xing Ji & J.L. Zhou (2022)
- Polyporus lateralis Pers. (1827)
- Polyporus laticeps Speg. (1926)
- Polyporus lauterbachii (Henn.) Lloyd (1912)
- Polyporus lentinoides (Henn.) Lloyd (1911)
- Polyporus lepideus Fr. (1818)
- Polyporus leprieurii Mont. (1840)
- Polyporus lipsiensis (Batsch) E.H.L. Krause (1928)
- Polyporus lithophylloides Har. & Pat. (1902)
- Polyporus luteoluteus Lloyd (1911)

== M ==
- Polyporus maculosus Murrill (1904)
- Polyporus madagascariensis Lloyd (1915)
- Polyporus magnimutabilis Oba, Mossebo & Ryvarden (2019)
- Polyporus malacotis Bres. (1920)
- Polyporus maliciensis Lloyd (1912)
- Polyporus maliencis Lloyd (1912)
- Polyporus mangshanensis B.K. Cui, J.L. Zhou & Y.C. Dai (2016)
- Polyporus marmellosensis Henn. (1904)
- Polyporus mcmurphyi Murrill (1915)
- Polyporus megasporoporus Y.C. Dai, Yuan Yuan & Ya.R. Wang (2021)
- Polyporus melaleucus Bres. (1912)
- Polyporus melanosporus Lloyd (1920)
- Polyporus melleofulvus (Romell) Sacc. & P. Syd. (1902)
- Polyporus metallicus Lloyd (1920)
- Polyporus mindoroi Lloyd (1924)
- Polyporus minitenuiculus Gminder & Ryvarden (2021)
- Polyporus minor Z.S. Bi & G.Y. Zheng (1982)
- Polyporus minoris-mylittae Cleland & Cheel (1919)
- Polyporus minusculus Boud. (1902)
- Polyporus minutofruticum Lloyd (1913)
- Polyporus minutosquamosus Runnel & Ryvarden (2016)
- Polyporus minutus Vanin (1923)
- Polyporus molliculus Bres. (1920)
- Polyporus mongolicus (Pilát) Y.C. Dai (1996)
- Polyporus motus Lloyd (1922)
- Polyporus mowryanus (Murrill) Murrill (1940)
- Polyporus multilobatus Lloyd (1922)
- Polyporus multisulcatus Rick (1935)
- Polyporus musashiensis (Henn.) Lloyd (1912)

== N ==
- Polyporus nauseosus (Pat.) Sacc. & D. Sacc. (1905)
- Polyporus neoformosus Ryvarden (2023)
- Polyporus nigrocafricanus Ryvarden (2019)
- Polyporus nigrocristatus E. Horak & Ryvarden (1984)
- Polyporus nigrocrustosus Lloyd (1915)
- Polyporus nigrovelutinus Ryvarden & Iturr. (2004)

== O ==
- Polyporus ochrogilvus Lloyd (1924)
- Polyporus ochrotenuis Lloyd (1924)
- Polyporus oncospermatis (Corner) T. Hatt. (2003)
- Polyporus orientivarius H. Lee, N.K. Kim & Y.W. Lim (2017)

== P ==
- Polyporus pallidofulvellus (Murrill) Overh. (1926)
- Polyporus palpebralis Lloyd (1912)
- Polyporus parvivarius H. Lee, N.K. Kim & Y.W. Lim (2017)
- Polyporus patouillardii Lloyd (1915)
- Polyporus paulensis (Henn.) Lloyd (1912)
- Polyporus perae G. Arnaud (1921)
- Polyporus perelegans Lloyd (1936)
- Polyporus pervadens Corner (1984)
- Polyporus phyllostachydis Sotome, T. Hatt. & Kakish. (2007)
- Polyporus picicola Velen. (1922)
- Polyporus picipes Fr. (1838)
- Polyporus platensis Speg. (1881)
- Polyporus plorans (Pat.) Sacc. & D. Sacc. (1905)
- Polyporus podlachicus Bres. (1903)
- Polyporus polyacanthophorus Nakasone (2015)
- Polyporus polyporiformis (Corner) T. Hatt. & Sotome (2013)
- Polyporus preslianus Velen. (1922)
- Polyporus puiggarianus Henn. (1904)
- Polyporus pulchram Ryvarden (2019)
- Polyporus puttemansii Henn. (1904)

== R ==
- Polyporus radians Lloyd (1923)
- Polyporus radiatoscruposus (Henn.) Lloyd (1912)
- Polyporus radicatus Schwein. (1832)
- Polyporus ramicola Velen. (1922)
- Polyporus recurvatus Theiss. (1911)
- Polyporus reisneri Velen. (1922)
- Polyporus rhizomatophorus (Henn.) Lloyd (1912)
- Polyporus rhoadsii Murrill (1938)
- Polyporus rohlenae Velen. (1922)
- Polyporus rompelii Pat. & Rick (1907)
- Polyporus roseolus Rick (1911)
- Polyporus rubrocastaneus Lloyd (1912)
- Polyporus rufolateritius Kalchbr. (1882)
- Polyporus ruforugosus Lloyd (1924)
- Polyporus rugulosus Lév. (1844)

== S ==
- Polyporus saharanpurensis Henn. (1901)
- Polyporus sarbadhikarii (Bose) B.K. Bakshi (1971)
- Polyporus scaber Bres. (1920)
- Polyporus schimae S. Ito & S. Imai (1940)
- Polyporus schmidtii Rostr. (1902)
- Polyporus schreuderi Van der Byl (1922)
- Polyporus sepiaceus Lloyd (1920)
- Polyporus septosporus P.K. Buchanan & Ryvarden (1998)
- Polyporus setosus Lloyd (1915)
- Polyporus shiraianus Henn. (1900)
- Polyporus sordidissimus Speg. (1915)
- Polyporus sororius (P. Karst.) Sacc. & Trotter (1912)
- Polyporus spegazzinii (Bres.) Sacc. & Trotter (1925)
- Polyporus spissii Eichelb. (1906)
- Polyporus sprucei Lloyd (1912)
- Polyporus stewartae Coker (2019)
- Polyporus striatulus (Lloyd) Imazeki (1943)
- Polyporus subadmirabilis Bondartsev (1962)
- Polyporus subchioneus (Murrill) Sacc. & Trotter (1912)
- Polyporus suberosus (L.) Ferd. & C.A. Jørg. (1939)
- Polyporus subfloriformis Z.S. Bi & G.Y. Zheng (1982)
- Polyporus subfragilis Speg. (1926)
- Polyporus subhispidus Lloyd (1924)
- Polyporus sublignosus J.D. Zhao & X.Q. Zhang (1991)
- Polyporus submaculosus Murrill (1945)
- Polyporus submollis Z.S. Bi & G.Y. Zheng (1982)
- Polyporus submurinoides Rick (1960)
- Polyporus suboccidentalis (Sacc. & P. Syd.) B.K. Bakshi (1971)
- Polyporus subpertusus Lloyd (1919)
- Polyporus subpulverulentes Speg. (1938)
- Polyporus subvictoriensis Rick (1960)
- Polyporus subvirgatus Lloyd (1911)

== T ==
- Polyporus taromenane Toapanta-Alban, Ordoñez & Blanchette (2021)
- Polyporus tasmaniae Berk. ex G. Cunn. (1949)
- Polyporus thailandensis Sotome (2015)
- Polyporus trametoides Corner (1984)
- Polyporus transvaalensis Van der Byl (1925)
- Polyporus tuberaster (Jacq. ex Pers.) Fr. (1821)
- Polyporus tuckahoe (Güssow) Lloyd (1920)

== U ==
- Polyporus umbellatus (Pers.) Fr. (1821)
- Polyporus underwoodii Peck (1906)
- Polyporus urineus Velen. (1922)
- Polyporus ustus Rick (1935)

== V ==
- Polyporus vadosus Lloyd (1912)
- Polyporus vandykei Lloyd (1920)
- Polyporus vassilievae Thorn (2000)
- Polyporus violaceomaculatus Pat. (1907)

== W ==
- Polyporus weinzettlii Velen. (1922)
- Polyporus whetstonei Lloyd (1922)

== X ==
- Polyporus xinjiangensis J.D. Zhao & X.Q. Zhang (1981)

== Y ==
- Polyporus yoshinagae Lloyd (1915)
- Polyporus yuananensis X.Q. Zhang & J.D. Zhao (1987)
