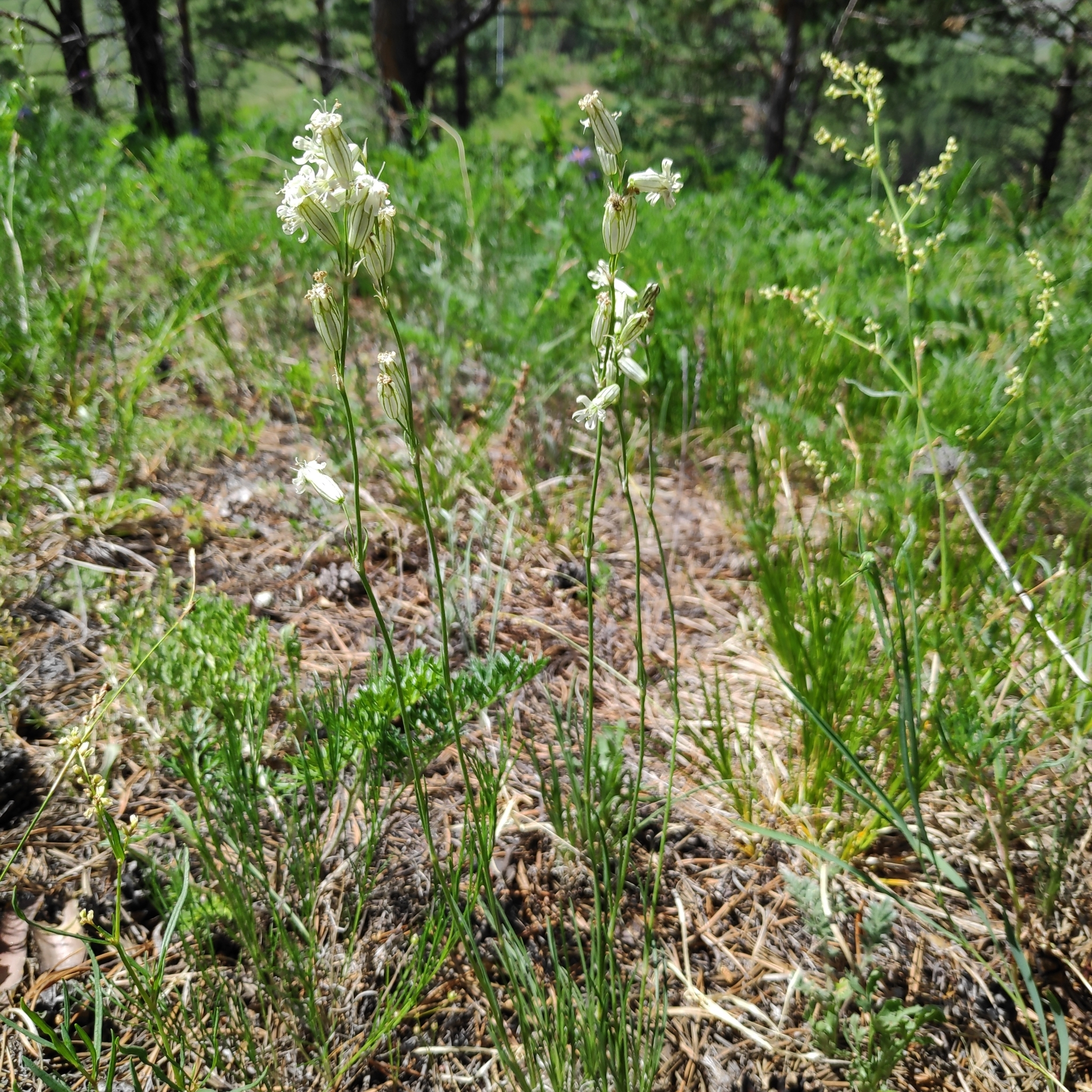

Scientific classification
- Kingdom: Plantae
- Clade: Tracheophytes
- Clade: Angiosperms
- Clade: Eudicots
- Order: Caryophyllales
- Family: Caryophyllaceae
- Genus: Silene
- Species: S. jenisseensis

Binomial name
- Silene jenisseensis Willd.

= Silene jenisseensis =

Species of flowering plant

Silene jenisseensis, is a species of flowering plant in the family Caryophyllaceae, native to Siberia, Far East and Mongolia.

== Chemistry ==
Phytochemical analysis of Silene jenisseensis roots have found ecdysteroid 20-hydroxyecdysone, sterol α-spinasterol-3-O-glucoside, triterpenoids quillaic acid derivatives — jenisseensoside A, B, C and D. In herb of Silene jenisseensis flavone-C-glycosides were detected including vitexin, isovitexin, orientin, isoorientin, as well as ecdysteroids 2-desoxyecdysone, 2-desoxy-20-hydroxyecdysone, ponasterone A, dacryhainansterone, 20-hydroxyecdysone and integristerone A. Total content of ecdysteroids in Silene jenisseensis roots and herb collected in Buryatia Republic was 0.06% and 0.06—0.83%, respectively.

== Uses ==
Triterpenoids jenisseensoside A—D showed inhibitory effect in the cyclooxygenase inhibition assay, significant enhancement of the granulocyte phagocytosis, and cytotoxicity against human colon cancer cells (HP 29).
