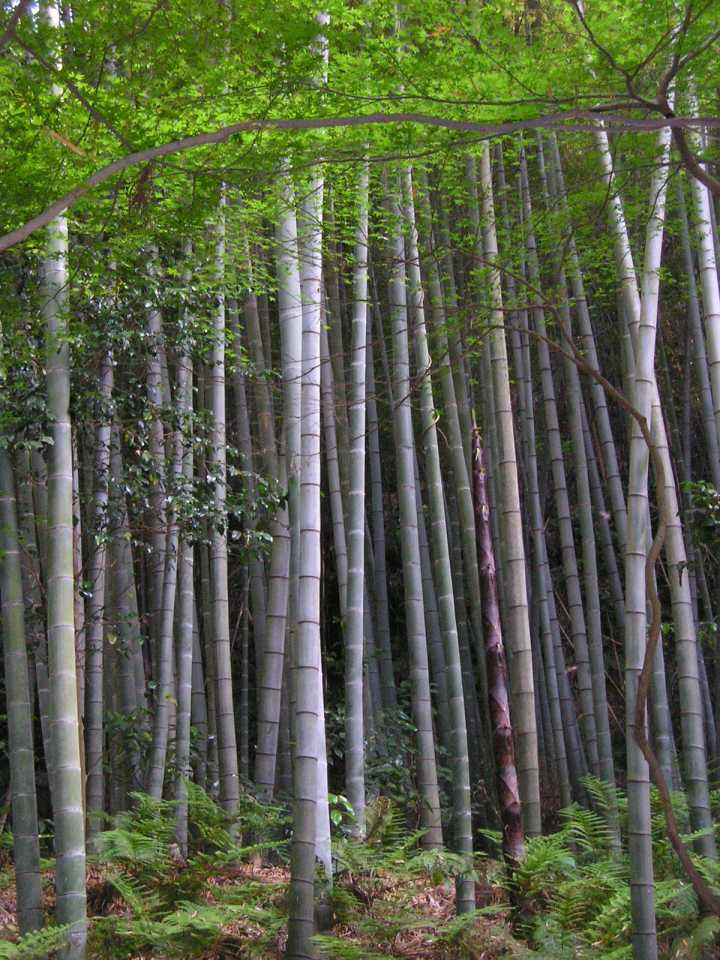
- Bamboo forest

Scientific classification
- Kingdom: Plantae
- Clade: Tracheophytes
- Clade: Angiosperms
- Clade: Monocots
- Clade: Commelinids
- Order: Poales
- Family: Poaceae
- Genus: Phyllostachys
- Species: P. edulis

Binomial name
- Phyllostachys edulis (Carrière) J.Houz., 1906

Synonyms
- Bambos moosoo Siebold; Bambusa edulis Carrière; Bambusa heterocycla Carrière; Bambusa mitis Carrière; Bambusa pubescens Pradelle; Phyllostachys bicolor Crouzet; Phyllostachys heterocycla (Carrière) Matsum., 1895; Phyllostachys pubescens (Pradelle) Mazel ex J.Houz., 1908

= Phyllostachys edulis =

Species of grass

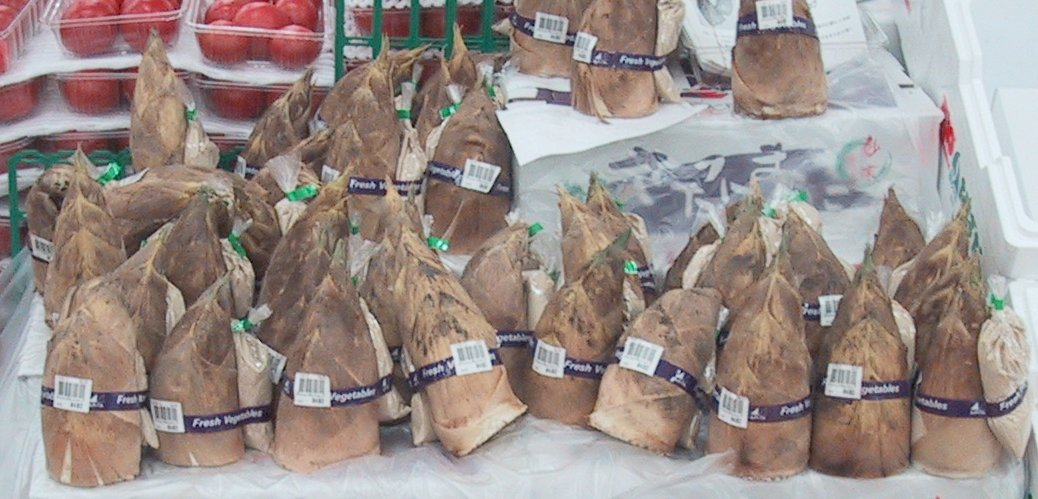
Bamboo shoots

Bamboo path in Georgia

Phyllostachys edulis, the mōsō bamboo, or tortoise-shell bamboo, or mao zhu (Chinese: 毛竹; pinyin: máozhú), (Japanese: モウソウチク), (Chinese: 孟宗竹) is a temperate species of giant timber bamboo native to China and Taiwan and naturalised elsewhere, including Japan where it is widely distributed from south of Hokkaido to Kagoshima. The edulis part of the Latin name refers to its edible shoots. This bamboo can reach heights of up to 28 m (92 ft). This particular species of bamboo is the most common species used in the bamboo textile industry of China and other countries, for the production of rayon. Moso is less cold-hardy than many Phyllostachy, surviving at a reduced height down to −15 °C (5 °F).

== Ecology ==
Phyllostachys edulis spreads using both asexual and sexual reproduction. The most common and well known mode for this plant is asexual reproduction. This occurs when the plant sends up new culms from underground rhizomes. The culms grow quickly and can reach a height of 28 m (92 ft) (depending on the age and health of the plant). In mature individuals, the culms in young plants grow taller and wider in diameter as the general plant reaches maturity, but once the individual culm stops growing it will not grow again. P. edulis also flowers and produces seed, and it does so every half century or so, but it has a sporadic flowering nature rather than the synchronous blooming seen in some other bamboo species. The seeds fall from the mature culms in the hundreds of thousands and are quick to germinate. Mice, field rats and other rodents take notice of the bounty of seed, this results in the loss of many of the seeds, but within a few weeks the surviving few seeds would have germinated (see predator satiation). The first culm from a seedling will not get much taller than around 10 cm (3.9 in) at most, and may be as thin as 2 mm (0.079 in), but with every new season of culms sent up from developing rhizomes, the grove of plants will grow in height and cane diameter. Moso bamboo grows as much as 119 cm (47 in) in twenty-four hours. But because the culms of Moso are up to 22 cm (8.7 in) diameter, its volume growth is much greater than that of Phyllostachys bambusoides.

Polyporus phyllostachydis (Sotome, T. Hatt. & Kakish.) is a fungus species known from Japan, that grows on the ground on the living or dead roots of the bamboo.

== Cultivation ==
=== Cultivars ===
Cultivars include:

- Phyllostachys edulis 'Bicolor'
- Phyllostachys edulis 'Kikko' or 'Kikko-Chiku' (syn.: Phyllostachys edulis var. heterocycla)
- Phyllostachys edulis 'Subconvexa' (syn.: Phyllostachys heterocycla f. subconvexa, Phyllostachys pubescens 'Subconvexa')
- Phyllostachys edulis 'Nabeshimana' (syn.: Phyllostachys heterocycla f. nabeshimana, Phyllostachys pubescens f. luteosulcata)

== Biochemistry ==
Compounds isolated from P. edulis include:

- Hydroxycinnamic acids
  - p-coumaric acid
  - caffeic acid
  - ferulic acid
- Chlorogenic acids
  - chlorogenic acid (3-(3,4-dihydroxycinnamoyl)quinic acid)
  - 3-O-(3'-methylcaffeoyl)quinic acid
  - 5-O-caffeoyl-4-methylquinic acid
  - 3-O-caffeoyl-1-methylquinic acid (C_{17}H_{20}O_{9}, exact mass : 368.110732).
- Flavones
  - tricin
  - 7-O-methyltricin
  - Glycosylated flavones
    - orientin
    - isoorientin
    - vitexin
    - isovitexin
    - 5,7,3'-trihydroxy-6-C-β-D-digitoxopyranosyl-4'-O-β-D-glucopyranosyl flavonoside
    - 5,3',4'-trihydroxy-7-O-β-D-glucopyranosyl flavonoside
    - 5,4'-dihydroxy-3',5',-dimethoxy-7-O-β-D-glucopyranosyl flavonoside
    - 5,7,3',4'-trihydroxy-6-C-(α-L-rhamnopyranosyl-[1→6])-β-D-glucopyranosyl flavonoside
