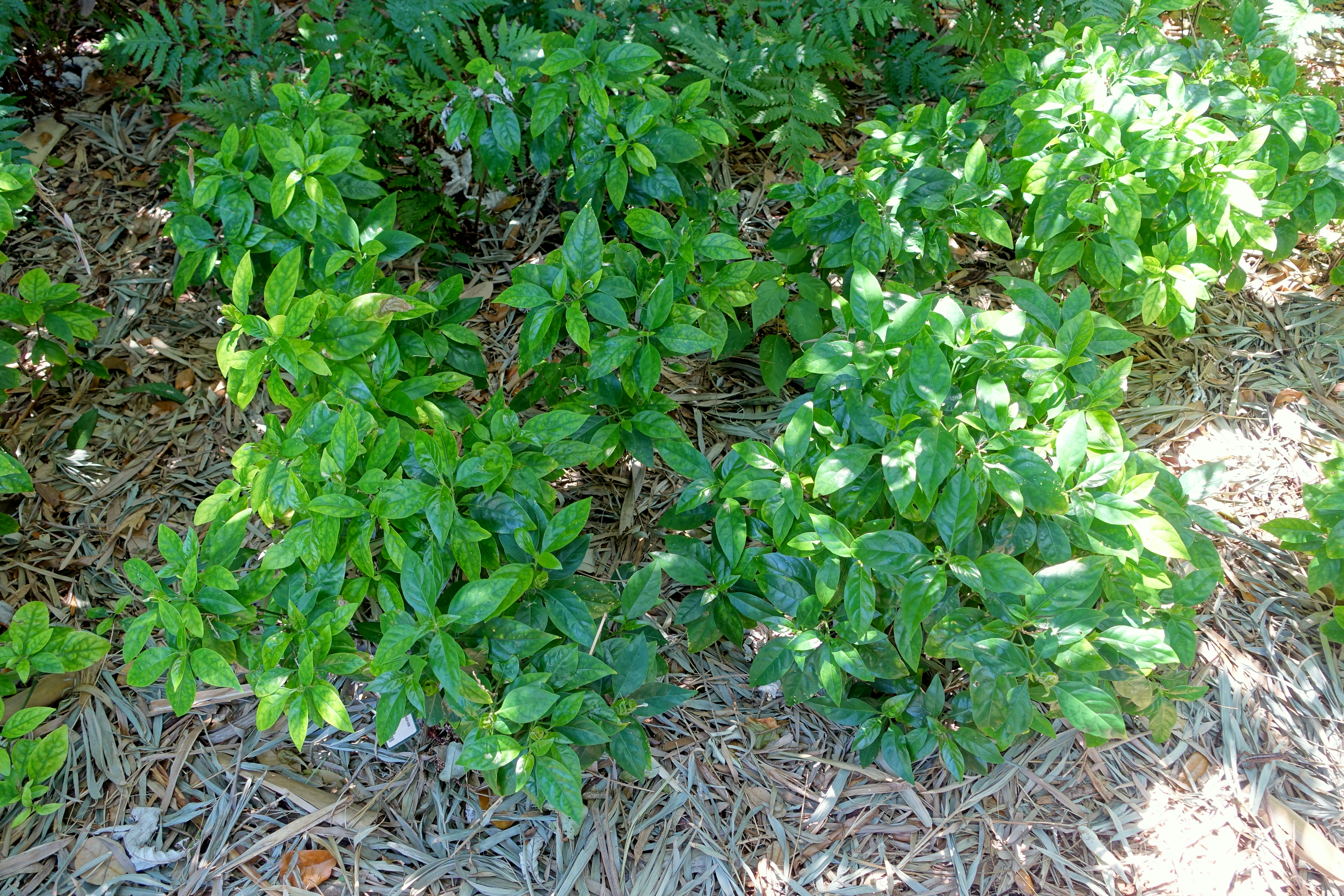

Scientific classification
- Kingdom: Plantae
- Clade: Tracheophytes
- Clade: Angiosperms
- Clade: Eudicots
- Clade: Asterids
- Order: Lamiales
- Family: Acanthaceae
- Genus: Ecbolium
- Species: E. viride

Binomial name
- Ecbolium viride (Forssk.) Alston

Synonyms
- Ecbolium linneanum var. rotundifolium (Nees) C.B.Clarke; Ecbolium viride var. chandrasekariana Remadevi & Binojk.; Ecbolium viride var. dentatum (Klein ex Link) M.R.Almeida; Ecbolium viride var. laetevirens Raizada; Justicia rotundifolia Nees; Justicia viridis Forssk.

= Ecbolium viride =

Species of flowering plant

Ecbolium viride is a species of Ecbolium of the family Acanthaceae. It can be found in Bangladesh, India and Sri Lanka, where it is widely used as a medicinal plant.

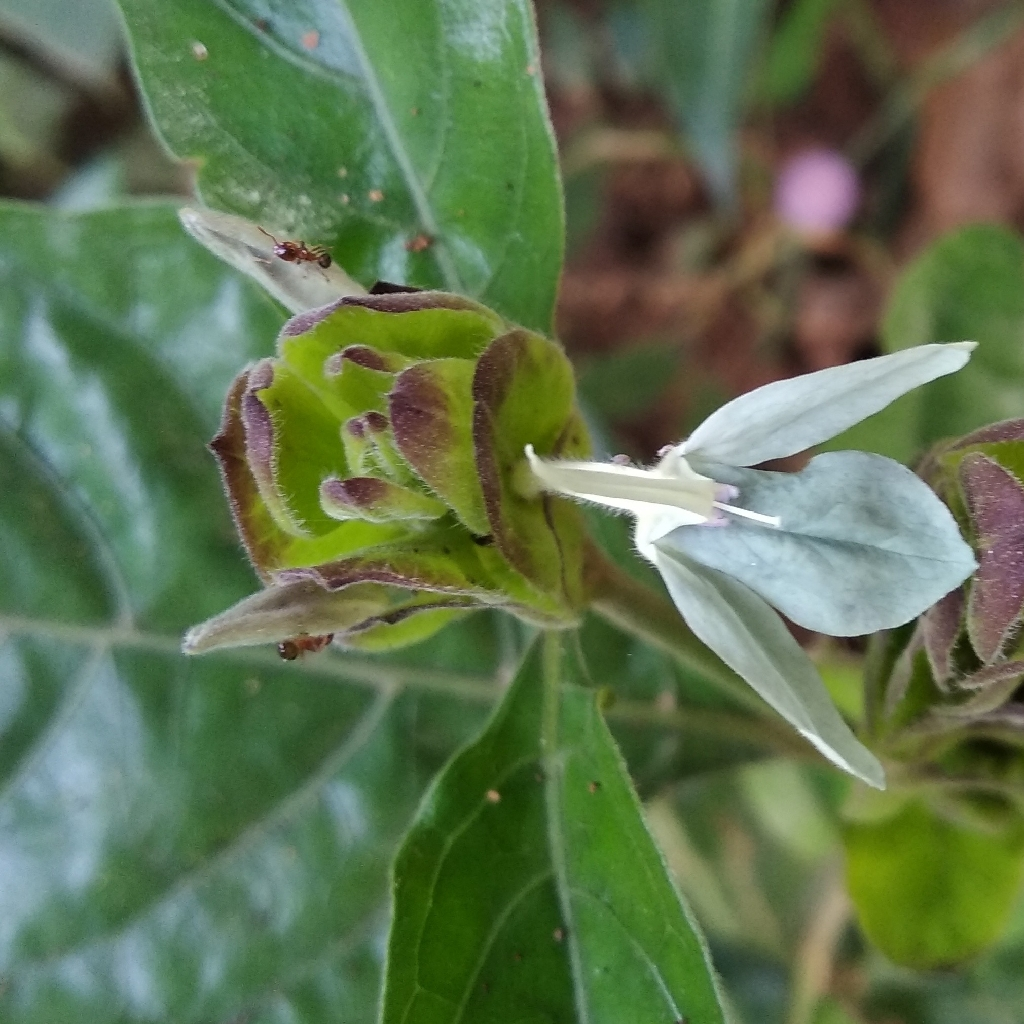
Flower

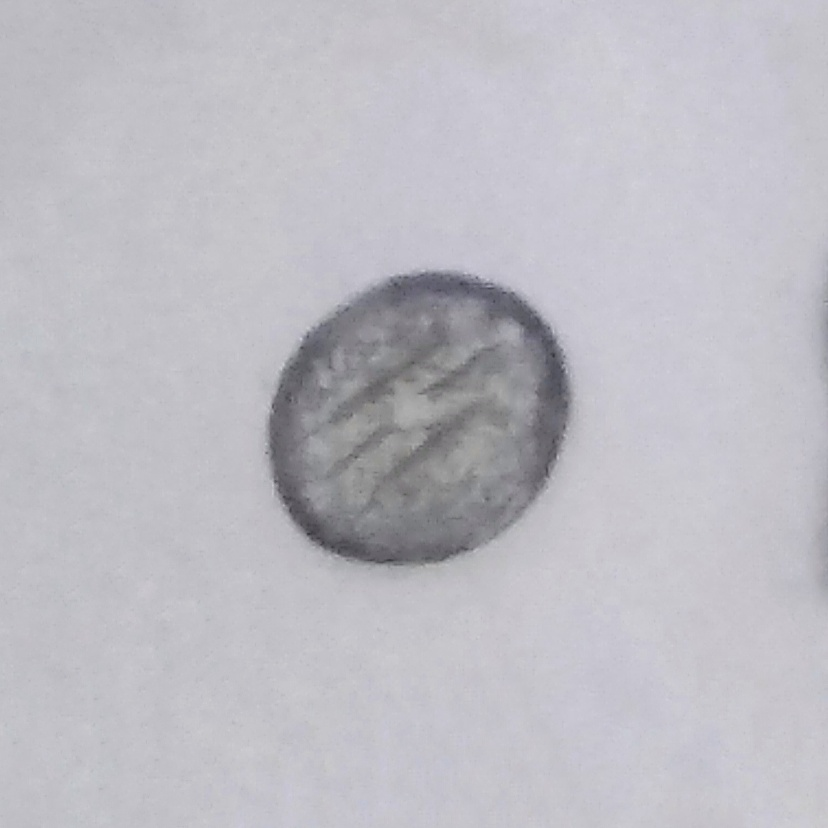
Pollen

== Chemical present ==
Leaves, roots and flowers contain orientin, vitexin, isoorientin, isovitexin.
