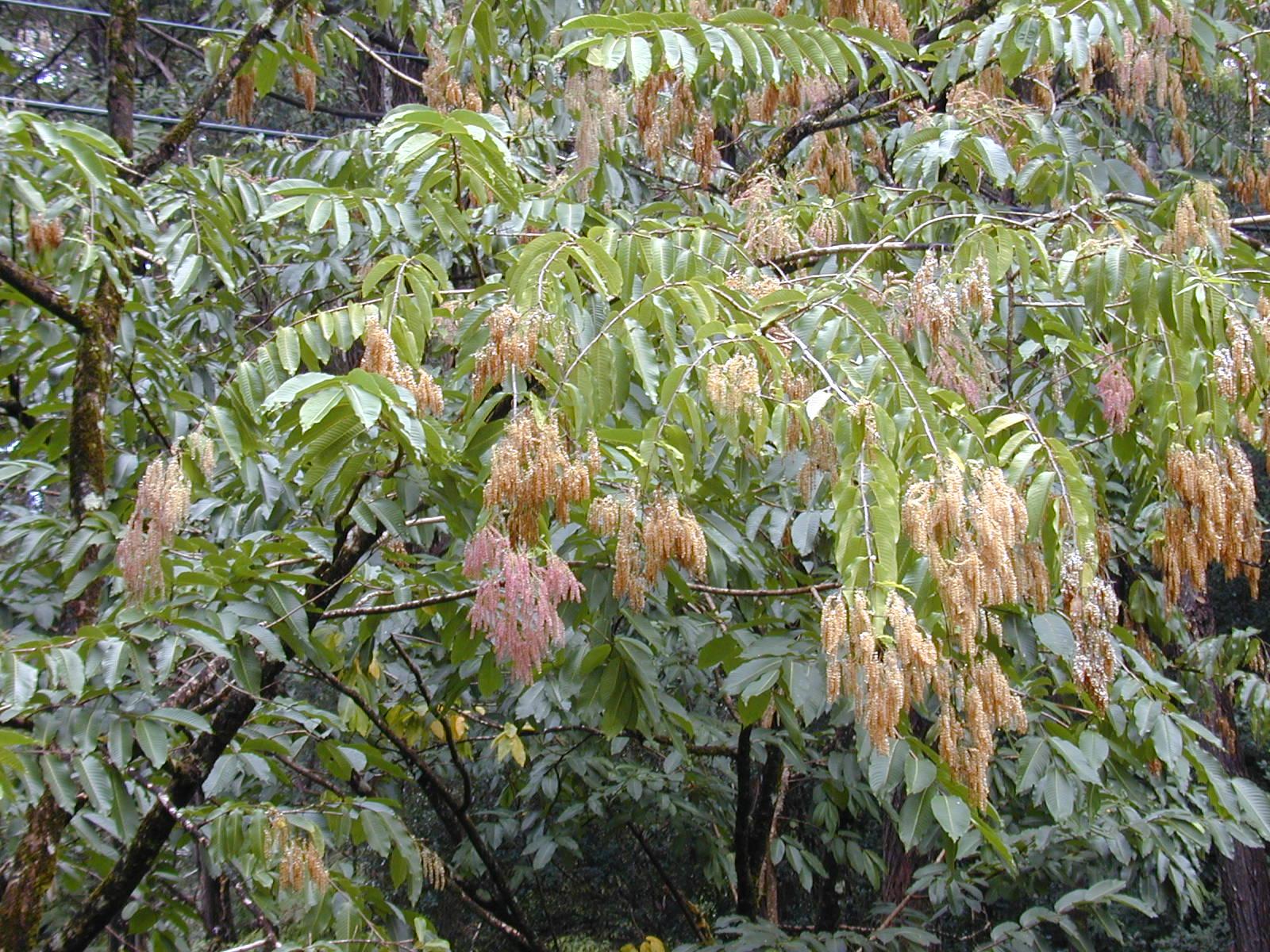
- Terminalia myriocarpa (flowers). Location: Maui, Puaa Kaa

Scientific classification
- Kingdom: Plantae
- Clade: Tracheophytes
- Clade: Angiosperms
- Clade: Eudicots
- Clade: Rosids
- Order: Myrtales
- Family: Combretaceae
- Genus: Terminalia
- Species: T. myriocarpa

Binomial name
- Terminalia myriocarpa Van Heurck and Mull.Arg.

= Terminalia myriocarpa =

Species of tree

Terminalia myriocarpa, the East Indian almond, is a tree species in the genus Terminalia found in Southeast Asia.

== Ecology ==
The larvae of the moth Acrocercops terminaliae feed on T. myriocarpa.

== Chemistry ==
The phenolic compounds methyl (S)-flavogallonate, gallic acid, methyl gallate, ethyl gallate, 2,3-di-O-[(S)-4,5,6,4′,5′,6′-hexahydroxybiphenyl-2,2′-diyldicarbonyl]-(α/β)-D-glucopyranose, vitexin, isovitexin, orientin, iso-orientin, kaempferol 3-O-β-D-rutinoside, rutin, neosaponarin, ellagic acid, flavogallonic acid and (α/β)-punicalagin can be isolated from the leaves of T. myriocarpa.
