= E313 =

E313 may refer to:

- European route E313
- NEC e313, a handheld 3G phone from NEC Corporation
- Ethyl gallate food additive E number
