= Neelambari =

Neelambari may refer to:

- Neelambari (raga), a raga in Carnatic and Hindustani classical music
- Neelambari (1978 film), a 1978 Malayalam film
- Neelambari (2001 film), a 2001 Kannada film
- Neelambari (2010 film), a 2010 Malayalam film
- "Neelambari" (song), 2021 song by Anurag Kulkarni
- Neelambari, a character in the 1999 Indian Tamil-language film Padayappa
- Neelambari, the Tamil name for the plant "Ecbolium viride"

== See also ==
- Nilambar, last ruler of the Kamata Kingdom in Assam, India
- Nilamber and Pitamber, Indian rebels against British rule in India
