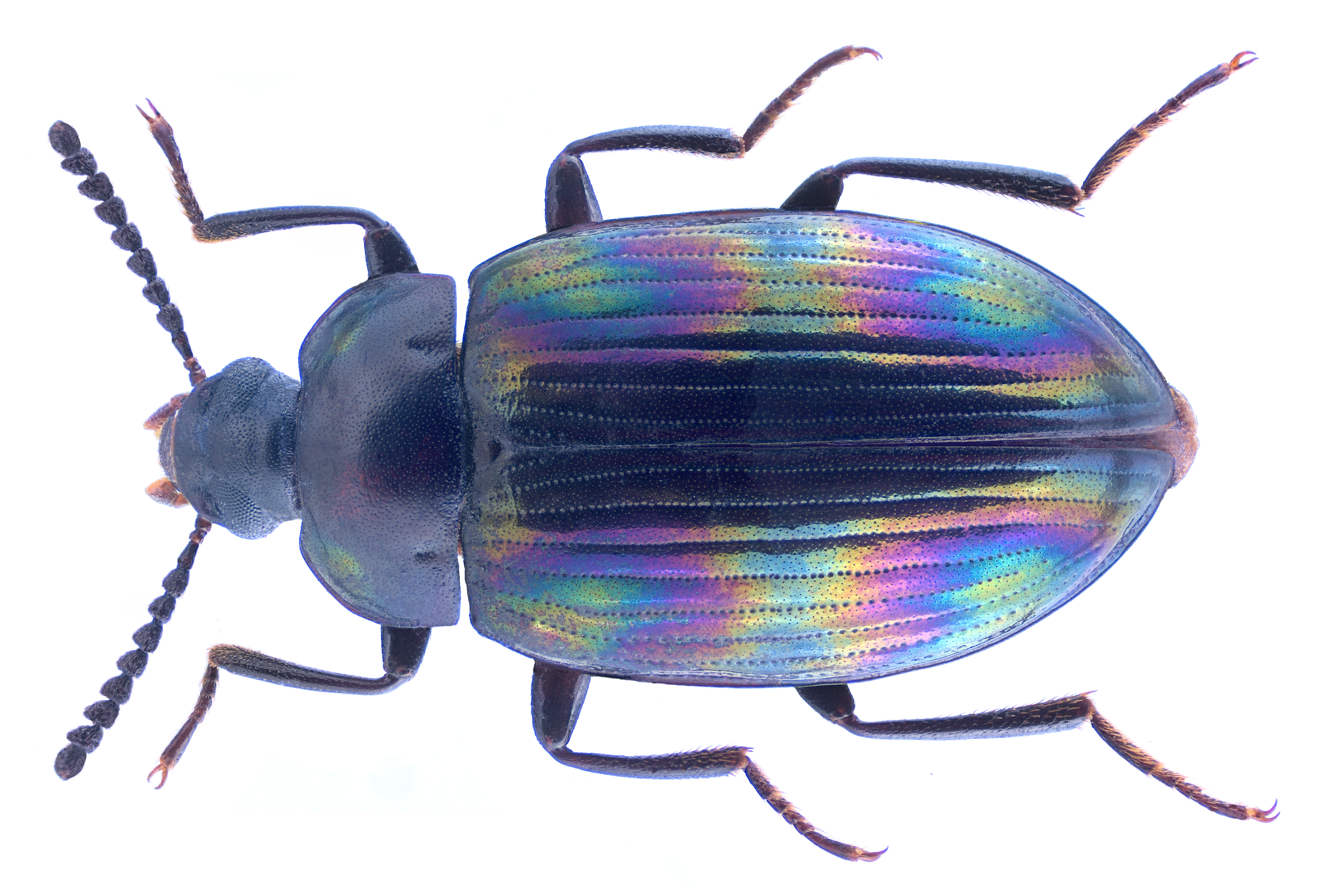

Scientific classification
- Kingdom: Animalia
- Phylum: Arthropoda
- Class: Insecta
- Order: Coleoptera
- Suborder: Polyphaga
- Infraorder: Cucujiformia
- Family: Tenebrionidae
- Genus: Ceropria
- Species: C. induta

Binomial name
- Ceropria induta (Wiedemann, 1819)

Synonyms
- Helops indutus Wiedemann, 1819

= Ceropria induta =

Species of beetle

Ceropria induta is a species of darkling beetle native to Asia. It is commonly found in Japan, Korea, southern China to Assam, Sri Lanka and towards islands of Indonesia and the Philippines. There is a sporadic appearance of the species from southern Florida, USA and Macau regions.

== Description ==
Body length is about 8 – 9 mm. Oval in dorsal view with smooth and shining dorsum. There is a multicolored metallic sheen on elytra in concentric zones of colors. Pronotum tinged with metallic luster in lateral sides and blackish in medial regions. Head, legs and ventral surfaces are black in color. Antennae serrate with 4-10 broadly triangular antennomeres. Males can be clearly identified due to meso-tibiae which is distinctly curved.

The larva has been observed from Polyporus species of tree fungi in Japan. In South East Asian region, the beetle is commonly found in fungus brackets and under bark of logs and stumps. At night, they used to bore in dead tree trunks and rotting stumps. In Macau and Florida, it is found closely associated with Ganoderma lucidum.

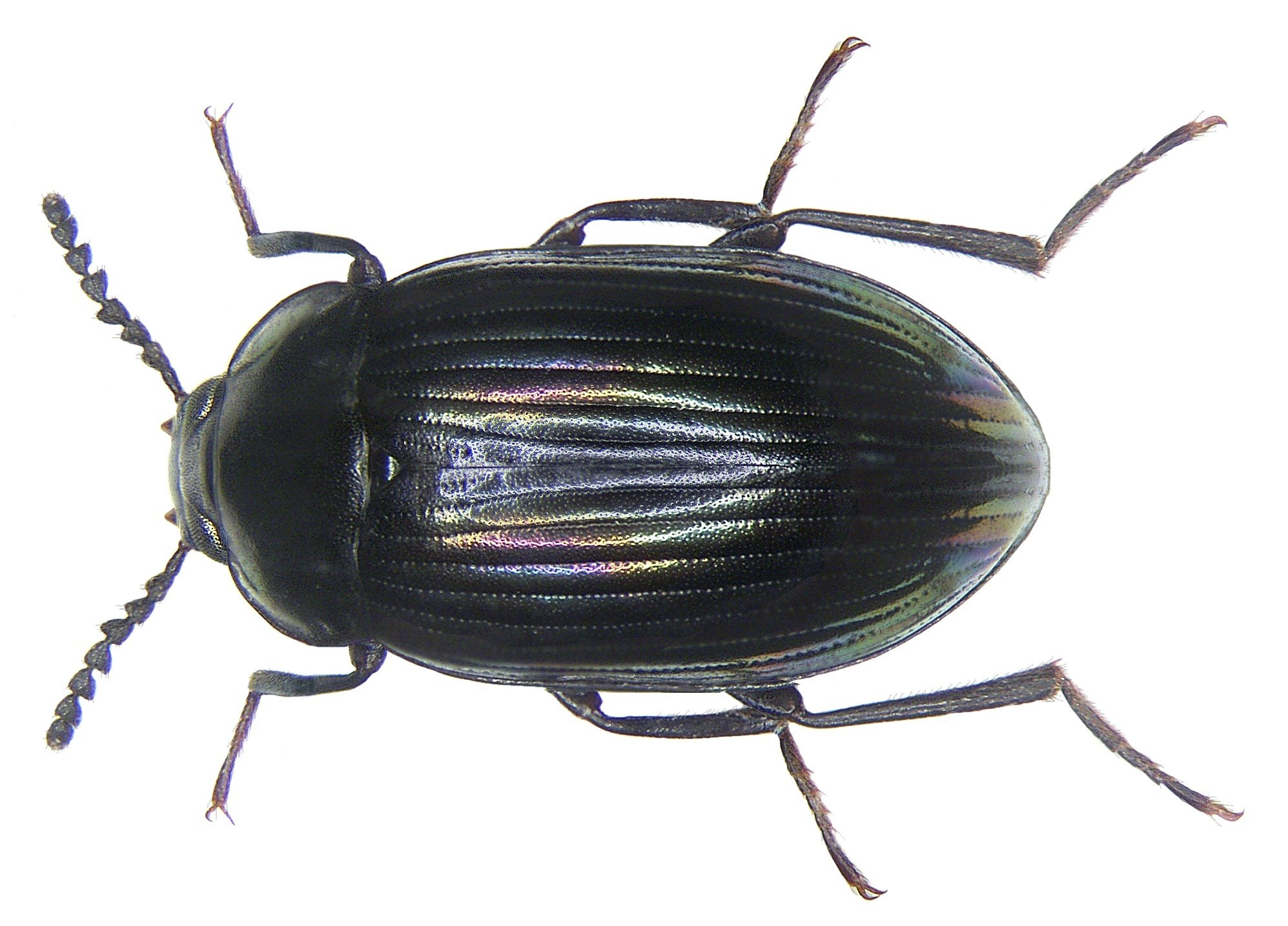

Tenebrapolipus ceropriae is a known parasite of the beetle from Japan.
