= Sotome =

Sotome may refer to:

- Sotome, Nagasaki, a former town located in Nishisonogi District, Nagasaki, Japan
- Kōichirō Sōtome, the director of the adaptation of the Kenkō Zenrakei Suieibu Umishō manga into an anime television series
- Kozue Sotome, an author who described the fungus species Polyporus phyllostachydis
