= Isoorientin 3'-O-methyltransferase =

Identifiers
- EC no.: 2.1.1.78
- CAS no.: 83061-51-2

Databases
- IntEnz: IntEnz view
- BRENDA: BRENDA entry
- ExPASy: NiceZyme view
- KEGG: KEGG entry
- MetaCyc: metabolic pathway
- PRIAM: profile
- PDB structures: RCSB PDB PDBe PDBsum
- Gene Ontology: AmiGO / QuickGO
Search
- PMC: articles
- PubMed: articles
- NCBI: proteins

Isoorientin 3'-O-methyltransferase (EC 2.1.1.78) is an enzyme that catalyzes the chemical reaction

isoorientin
+ SAM
isoscoparin
+ SAH

This is a methylation reaction in which the luteolin-6-C-glucoside, isoorientin, is converted to isoscoparin. The methyl group comes from the cofactor, S-adenosyl methionine (SAM), which becomes S-adenosyl-L-homocysteine (SAH).

This enzyme belongs to the family of transferases, specifically those transferring one-carbon group methyltransferases. The systematic name of this enzyme class is S-adenosyl-L-methionine:isoorientin 3'-O-methyltransferase. This enzyme is also called isoorientin 3'-methyltransferase.
