= GAEE =

GAEE may refer to:

- Gallic acid ethyl ester, a chemical compound added to food as an antioxidant.
- Google Apps Education Edition, a version of Google Apps platform for educators.
- Kami Reh Gaee, a 2013 Pakistani soap opera.
