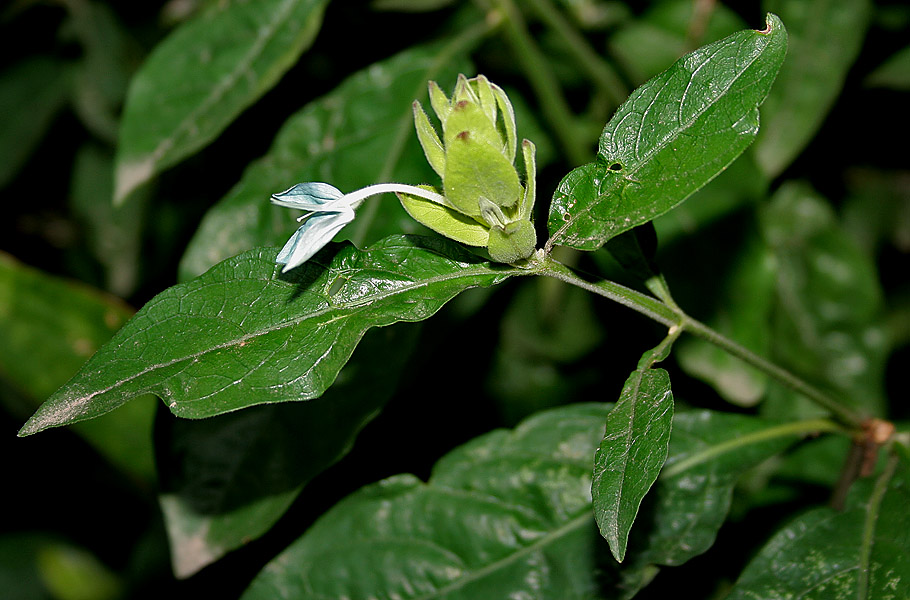
- Ecbolium ligustrinum

Scientific classification
- Kingdom: Plantae
- Clade: Embryophytes
- Clade: Tracheophytes
- Clade: Spermatophytes
- Clade: Angiosperms
- Clade: Eudicots
- Clade: Asterids
- Order: Lamiales
- Family: Acanthaceae
- Tribe: Justicieae
- Genus: Ecbolium; Kurz (1871)

Species
- 26; see text

= Ecbolium =

Genus of flowering plants

Ecbolium is a genus of flowering plants in the family Acanthaceae. It includes 26 species native to southern and eastern Africa, the Arabian Peninsula, the Indian subcontinent, and Myanmar.

== Species ==
26 species are accepted.

- Ecbolium albiflorum Vollesen
- Ecbolium amplexicaule S.Moore
- Ecbolium barlerioides (S.Moore) Lindau
- Ecbolium benoistii Vollesen
- Ecbolium boranense Vollesen
- Ecbolium clarkei Hiern
- Ecbolium fimbriatum Benoist
- Ecbolium flanaganii C.B.Clarke
- Ecbolium glabratum Vollesen
- Ecbolium gymnostachyum (Nees) Milne-Redh.
- Ecbolium hastatum Vollesen
- Ecbolium humbertii Vollesen
- Ecbolium ligustrinum (Vahl) Vollesen
- Ecbolium madagascariense Vollesen
- Ecbolium oblongifolium Vollesen
- Ecbolium palmatum (Nees) Kuntze
- Ecbolium strictum O.Schwartz
- Ecbolium subcordatum C.B.Clarke
- Ecbolium syringifolium (Vahl) Vollesen
- Ecbolium tanzaniense Vollesen
- Ecbolium viride (Forssk.) Alston
