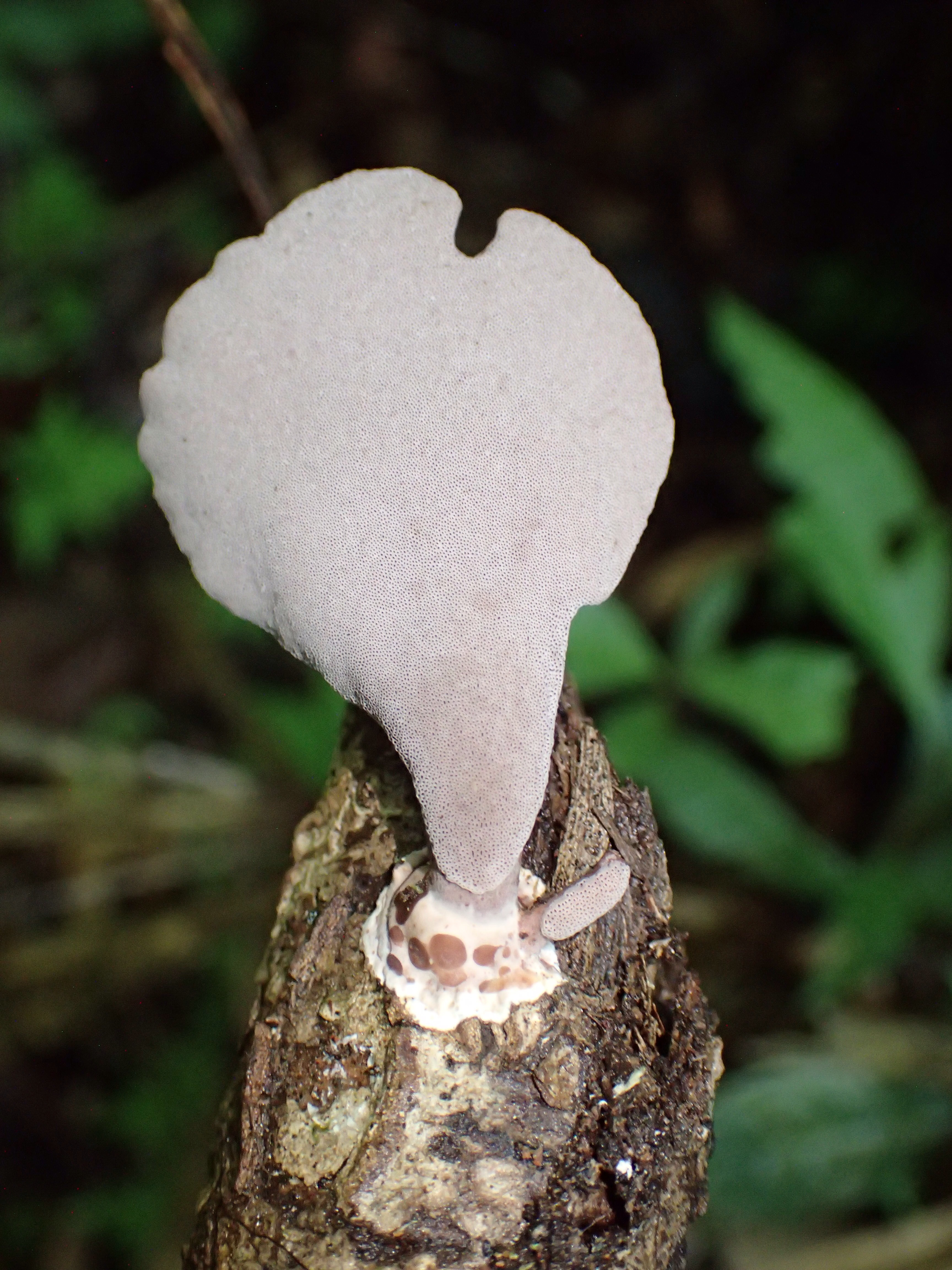

Scientific classification
- Kingdom: Fungi
- Division: Basidiomycota
- Class: Agaricomycetes
- Order: Polyporales
- Family: Polyporaceae
- Genus: Favolus
- Species: F. ianthinus

Binomial name
- Favolus ianthinus (Gibertoni & Ryvarden) Zmitr. & Kovalenko 2016

Synonyms
- Polyporus ianthinus Gibertoni & Ryvarden (2004)

= Favolus ianthinus =

Species of fungus

Favolus ianthinus is a species of fungus in the family Polyporaceae. Found in Brazil, it was described as new to science in 2004 by mycologists Tatiana Baptista Gibertoni and Leif Ryvarden.
