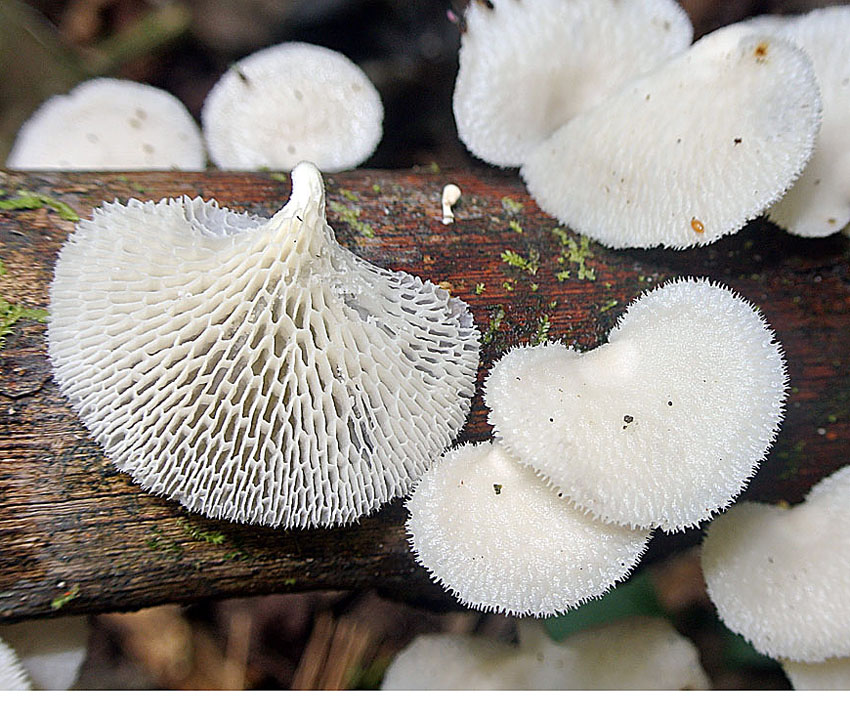
- Favolus tenuiculus

Scientific classification
- Kingdom: Fungi
- Division: Basidiomycota
- Class: Agaricomycetes
- Order: Polyporales
- Family: Polyporaceae
- Genus: Favolus; Fr. (1828)

Type species
- Favolus brasiliensis (Fr.) Fr. (1830)

= Favolus =

Genus of fungi

Favolus, or honeycomb fungus, is a genus of fungi in the family Polyporaceae. The fruit bodies of Favolus species are fleshy with radially arranged pores on the underside of the cap that are angular and deeply pitted, somewhat resembling a honeycomb.

== Taxonomy ==
The naturalist Palisot de Beauvois was the first to use the name Favolus in his 1805 work Flore d'Oware et de Benin, en Afrique. His type species was Favolus hirtus, a fungus first collected in Africa. Elias Fries used the name as a subgenus of Polyporus in 1821. Seven years later, Fries used the name Favolus for a different genus, with the tropical species F. brasiliensis as the type. Fries's concept of the genus was later accepted as it was published in one of the sanctioning works of mycology. Favolus hirtus is now called Trametes hirta, and Beauvois' concept of Favolus is placed in synonymy with Trametes. The generic name Favolus is derived from the Latin favus meaning honeycomb.

Until relatively recently, many works have considered Favolus to be synonymous with Polyporus. Based on molecular phylogenetic analysis, Favolus species were shown to form two genera, and several species were transferred to Neofavolus in 2013. This reorganization was accepted and verified in later studies.

== Description ==
The fruit bodies of Favolus fungi are annual, and have a stipe that is situated laterally to substipitate or almost sessile. The shape of the cap is spatulate (with a broad, rounded end), reniform (kidney shaped) to dimidiate (divided into two equal parts). The texture of the cap surface can be smooth, or may have minute hairs, sometimes with stiff tufts or spiny scales toward the base. Often featuring radial grooves, the cap surface is variable in colour. The stipe is cylindrical to flattened or reduced. The internal tissue of the fruit body (context) has a tough and fleshy to leathery texture when fresh, becoming leathery to corky or brittle when dried. Pores on the underside of the cap are large to small, and either regular or radially elongated.

Favolus has a dimitic hyphal system, containing both generative and skeletal-binding hyphae. The generative hyphae are either with or without clamp connections. Skeletal-binding hyphae are usually dominating, arboriform (tree-like), and hyaline. The cap cuticle is not differentiated into distinct layers; if present it comprises non-agglutinated parallel hyphae that are up to 50 μm thick. Basidia are club-shaped, four-sterigmate. Spores are cylindrical to navicular (boat-shaped), thin-walled, smooth, and hyaline.

Favolus differs from Neofavolus in the features of the cap surface. In Neofavolus, it is smooth to scaly, with a cutis made of hyaline to brown, parallel and agglutinated, generative hyphae that are distinct from contextual hyphae, which mainly comprise non-agglutinated skeletal-binding hyphae.

== Species ==
As of June 2018, Index Fungorum accepts 25 species of Favolus.

- Favolus acervatus (Lloyd) Sotome & T.Hatt. (2013) – Singapore; Japan
- Favolus africanus Lloyd (1923)
- Favolus albidus Massee (1902)
- Favolus albostipes (Ryvarden & Iturr.) Zmitr. & Kovalenko (2016) – Venezuela
- Favolus albus Lloyd (1936)
- Favolus argentinensis Speg. (1909) – South America
- Favolus beelii Hendr. (1948)
- Favolus bengala Bose (1922)
- Favolus biskeletalis (Corner) Zmitr. & Kovalenko (2016) – Brazil
- Favolus brasiliensis (Fr.) Fr. (1830)

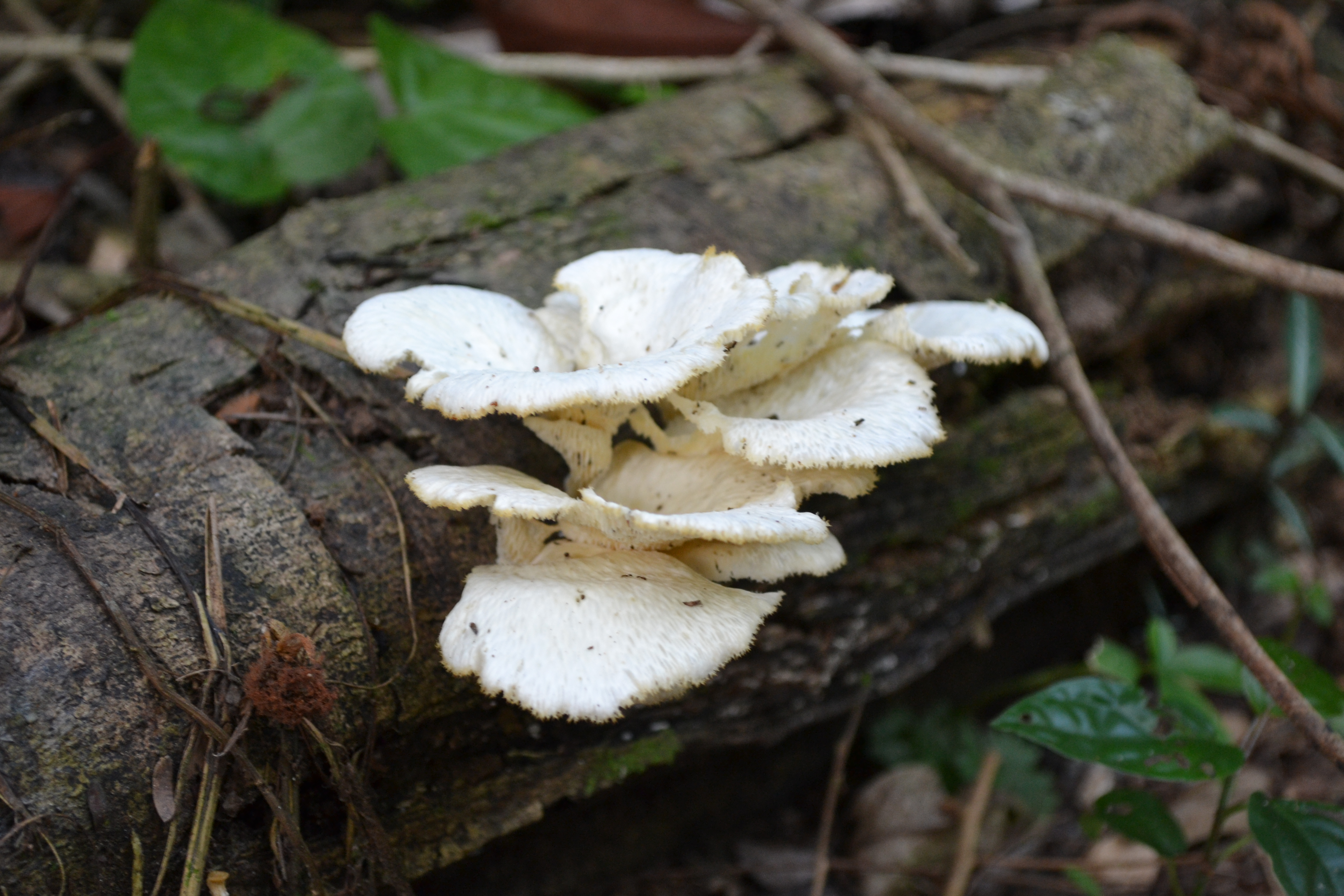
Favolus brasiliensis

- Favolus elongoporus (Drechsler-Santos & Ryvarden) Zmitr. & Kovalenko (2016)
- Favolus gracilisporus H.Lee, N.K.Kim & Y.W.Lim (2017)
- Favolus grammocephalus (Berk.) Imazeki (1943)
- Favolus ianthinus (Gibertoni & Ryvarden) Zmitr. & Kovalenko (2016) – Guyana; Brazil
- Favolus intestinalis Berk. (1851)
- Favolus maxonii (Murrill) Sacc. & Trotter (1912)
- Favolus microporus (Murrill) Sacc. & D.Sacc. (1905)
- Favolus niger Lloyd (1936)
- Favolus niveus J.L.Zhou & B.K.Cui (2017)
- Favolus parviporus Lloyd (1922)
- Favolus pseudobetulinus (Murashk. ex Pilát) Sotome & T.Hatt. (2013) – Eurasia, Japan, North America
- Favolus pseudoemerici J.L.Zhou & B.K.Cui (2017)
- Favolus pseudoprinceps (Murrill) Sacc. & Trotter (1912)
- Favolus septatus J.L.Zhou & B.K.Cui (2017)
- Favolus subspathulatus Lloyd (1936)
- Favolus subtropicus J.L.Zhou & B.K.Cui (2017)
- Favolus taxodii (Murrill) Sacc. & D.Sacc. (1905)
- Favolus tenuiculus P.Beauv. (1806)
- Favolus tessellatulus (Murrill) Sacc. & D.Sacc. (1905)
- Favolus trigonus Lloyd (1924)
