= Vitexin beta-glucosyltransferase =

Class of enzymes

Identifiers
- EC no.: 2.4.1.105
- CAS no.: 76828-68-7

Databases
- IntEnz: IntEnz view
- BRENDA: BRENDA entry
- ExPASy: NiceZyme view
- KEGG: KEGG entry
- MetaCyc: metabolic pathway
- PRIAM: profile
- PDB structures: RCSB PDB PDBe PDBsum
- Gene Ontology: AmiGO / QuickGO
Search
- PMC: articles
- PubMed: articles
- NCBI: proteins

Vitexin beta-glucosyltransferase (EC 2.4.1.105) is an enzyme that catalyzes the chemical reaction

vitexin
+ UDP-glucose
UDP
vitexin 2"-O-β-D-glucoside

The two substrates of this enzyme characterised from Silene alba are the flavonoid, vitexin, and UDP-glucose. Its products are vitexin 2"-O-β-D-glucoside and uridine diphosphate (UDP).

This enzyme belongs to the family of glycosyltransferases, specifically the hexosyltransferases. The systematic name of this enzyme class is UDP-glucose:vitexin 2. This enzyme is also called uridine diphosphoglucose-vitexin 2"-glucosyltransferase.
