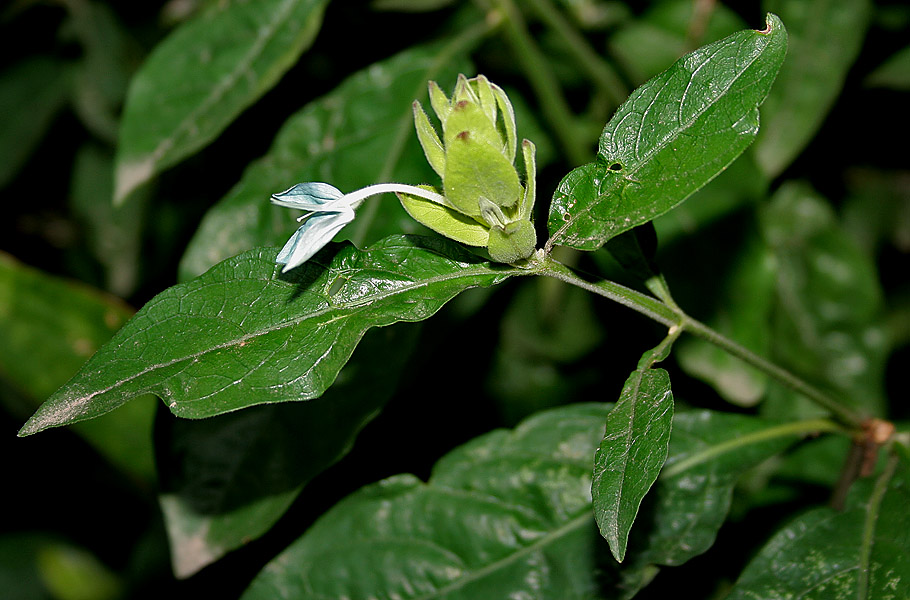

Scientific classification
- Kingdom: Plantae
- Clade: Tracheophytes
- Clade: Angiosperms
- Clade: Eudicots
- Clade: Asterids
- Order: Lamiales
- Family: Acanthaceae
- Genus: Ecbolium
- Species: E. ligustrinum

Binomial name
- Ecbolium ligustrinum (Vahl) Vollesen

Synonyms
- Justicia ecbolium L.; Justicia ligustrina Vahl; Ecbolium linneanum Kurz

= Ecbolium ligustrinum =

Species of flowering plant

Ecbolium ligustrinum, also known as green ice crossandra, green shrimp plant, and turquoise crossandra, is a species of flowering plant in the family Acanthaceae, native to eastern Africa, where it occurs in woodland, bushland, and savanna habitats. It is a perennial shrub or subshrub and a member of the genus Ecbolium, which is characterized by showy, tubular flowers and capsular fruits.

== Taxonomy and nomenclature ==
The species was first described by the Danish botanist Martin Vahl under the name Justicia ligustrina Vahl. It was later transferred to the genus Ecbolium by Kåre Vollesen during his taxonomic treatment of African Acanthaceae. The name Ecbolium ligustrinum (Vahl) Vollesen is currently accepted by major botanical authorities, including Plants of the World Online and the International Plant Names Index.

== Description ==
Ecbolium ligustrinum* is an erect to spreading perennial shrub or subshrub, woody at the base. Stems are glabrous to sparsely pubescent. Leaves are opposite, simple, and petiolate; the leaf blades are elliptic to oblong-elliptic, with entire margins, an acute to acuminate apex, and a cuneate base. Its flowers may be greenish-blue in colour.

Inflorescences are axillary or terminal, bearing solitary flowers or few-flowered clusters. Bracts are conspicuous, ovate to elliptic. The calyx is deeply divided into narrow lobes. The corolla is tubular and bilabiate, typically bluish to purplish, with a reduced upper lip and a broader lower lip. Stamens are two, included or slightly exserted, with dithecous anthers. The ovary is superior and two-locular, with a slender style and bifid stigma.

The fruit is a loculicidal capsule containing two seeds per locule, consistent with other members of the genus Ecbolium.

== Distribution and habitat ==
The species is native to eastern Africa, with confirmed records from countries including Kenya, Tanzania, and Uganda. It occurs in woodland, bushland, and savanna vegetation types, typically on well-drained soils. Its distribution is documented in regional floras and herbarium collections.
