= Acrocercops terminaliae =

Scientific classification
- Kingdom: Animalia
- Phylum: Arthropoda
- Clade: Pancrustacea
- Class: Insecta
- Order: Lepidoptera
- Family: Gracillariidae
- Genus: Acrocercops
- Species: A. terminaliae

Binomial name
- Acrocercops terminaliae (Stainton, 1862)

Species of moth

Acrocercops terminaliae is a moth of the family Gracillariidae. It is known from India (West Bengal).

The larvae feed on Terminalia catappa and Terminalia myriocarpa. They probably mine the leaves of their host plant.
