= Isovitexin beta-glucosyltransferase =

Class of enzymes

Identifiers
- EC no.: 2.4.1.106
- CAS no.: 72102-99-9

Databases
- IntEnz: IntEnz view
- BRENDA: BRENDA entry
- ExPASy: NiceZyme view
- KEGG: KEGG entry
- MetaCyc: metabolic pathway
- PRIAM: profile
- PDB structures: RCSB PDB PDBe PDBsum
- Gene Ontology: AmiGO / QuickGO
Search
- PMC: articles
- PubMed: articles
- NCBI: proteins

Isovitexin beta-glucosyltransferase (EC 2.4.1.106) is an enzyme that catalyzes the chemical reaction

isovitexin
+ UDP-glucose
UDP
2"-O-(β-D-glucosyl)isovitexin

The two substrates of this enzyme characterised from Silene alba are the flavanoid, isovitexin, and UDP-glucose. Its products are 2"-O-(β-D-glucosyl)isovitexin and uridine diphosphate (UDP).

This enzyme belongs to the family of glycosyltransferases, specifically the hexosyltransferases. The systematic name of this enzyme class is UDP-glucose:isovitexin 2"-O-beta-D-glucosyltransferase. This enzyme is also called uridine diphosphoglucose-isovitexin 2"-glucosyltransferase.
