= Vitexin (data page) =

Chemical data page

This page provides supplementary chemical data on vitexin.

== Material Safety Data Sheet ==
The handling of this chemical may incur notable safety precautions. It is highly recommend that you seek the Material Safety Datasheet (MSDS) for this chemical from a reliable source such as eChemPortal, and follow its directions.

- Sigma Aldrich MSDS from SDSdata.org

== Spectral data ==
UV-Vis
Lambda-max	UV : 335, 271 nm
Extinction coefficient	log ε: 4.08, 4.15
IR
Major absorption bands	? cm^{−1}
NMR
Proton NMR	1H-NMR (500 MHz, CD3COCD3 + D2O): δ 3.53 (1H, m, H-5′′), 3.54 (1H, m, H-3″), 3.57 (1H, m, H-4″), 3.74 (1H, dd, J = 12.3, 5.5 Hz, H-6a″), 3.77 (1H, dd, J = 12.3, 2.0 Hz, H-6b″), 4.11 (1H, t, J = 9.0 Hz, H-2″), 4.85 (1H, d, J = 9.9 Hz, H-1″); 6.44 (1H, s, H-8), 6.60 (1H, s, H-3), 6.95 (2H, d, J = 8.6 Hz, H-3′, 5′), 7.85 (2H, d, J = 8.6 Hz, H-2′, 6′)
Carbon-13 NMR	13C-NMR (125 MHz, CD3COCD3 + D2O): δ 61.7 (C-6″), 70.6 (C-4″), 72.0 (C-2″), 74.5 (C-1″), 79.2 (C-3″), 81.6 (C-5″), 95.3 (C-8), 103.4 (C-3), 104.3 (C-10), 108.7 (C-6), 116.7 (C-3′, 5′), 122.4 (C-1′), 129.0 (C-2′, 6′), 157.7 (C-9), 161.0 (C-5), 162.0(C- 4′), 164.5 (C-7), 165.0 (C-2), 183.1 (C-4)
Other NMR data
MS
Masses of main fragments	ESI-MS [M+H]+ m/z 433.1

This box:
- Except where noted otherwise, data relate to Standard temperature and pressure.
- Reliability of data general note.
