= Polyporus minutosquamosus =

Scientific classification
- Domain: Eukaryota
- Kingdom: Fungi
- Division: Basidiomycota
- Class: Agaricomycetes
- Order: Polyporales
- Family: Polyporaceae
- Genus: Polyporus
- Species: P. minutosquamosus

Binomial name
- Polyporus minutosquamosus Runnel & Ryvarden (2016)

Species of fungus

Polyporus minutosquamosus is a species of poroid fungus in the family Polyporaceae. Discovered in a tropical rainforest in Kaw, French Guiana, it was described as new to science in 2016 by mycologists Kadri Runnel and Leif Ryvarden. The fungus is characterized by a lateral stipe and fan-shaped caps with numerous small black scales. Phylogenetic analysis shows that although it is nested within the Polyporus sensu lato clade, it does not group with any of the subclades that have been previously identified in this genus.
