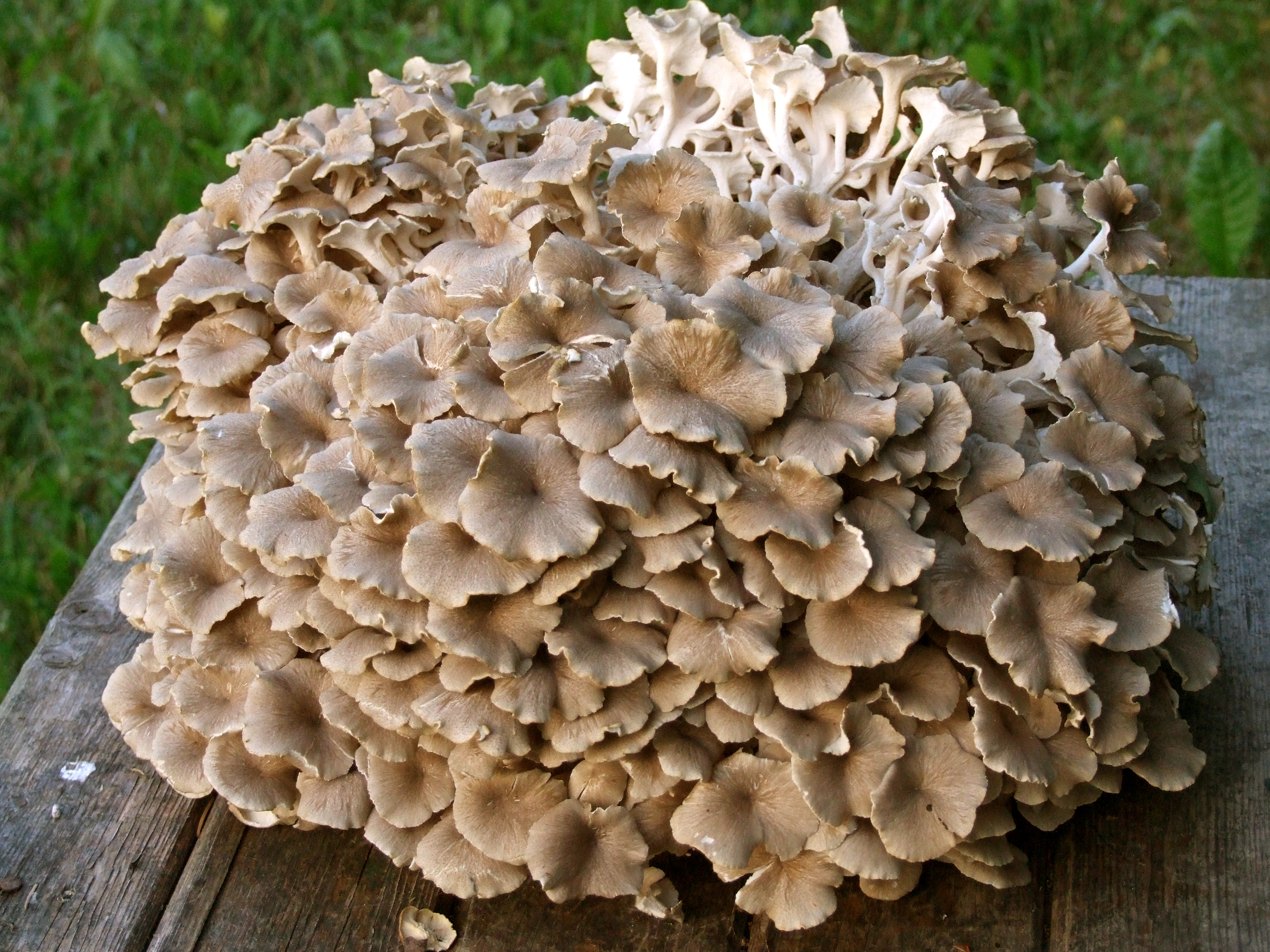

Scientific classification
- Kingdom: Fungi
- Division: Basidiomycota
- Class: Agaricomycetes
- Order: Polyporales
- Family: Polyporaceae
- Genus: Polyporus
- Species: P. umbellatus

Binomial name
- Polyporus umbellatus (Pers.) Fr. (1821)

Synonyms
- Dendropolyporus umbellatus (Pers.) Jülich

= Polyporus umbellatus =

Species of fungus

Polyporus umbellatus Mycological characteristics
- Pores on hymenium
- Spore print is white
- Ecology is saprotrophic
- Edibility is choice

Polyporus umbellatus is an edible species of mushroom. It is also called umbrella polypore.

== Description ==
The fruit body is composed of numerous (sometimes several hundred) caps. They are 1–4 centimetres (1/2–1 1/2 in) across, deeply umbilicate, light brown, and form the extremities of a strong, many branched stalk. The compound fungus can be up to 40 cm in diameter. The pores are decurrent, narrow and whitish. The stalk is whitish grey, 2.5–7 cm (1–3 in), and originates from a strong, underground, tuber-like nodule. The flesh is white and soft, hardening with age. The spore print is white.

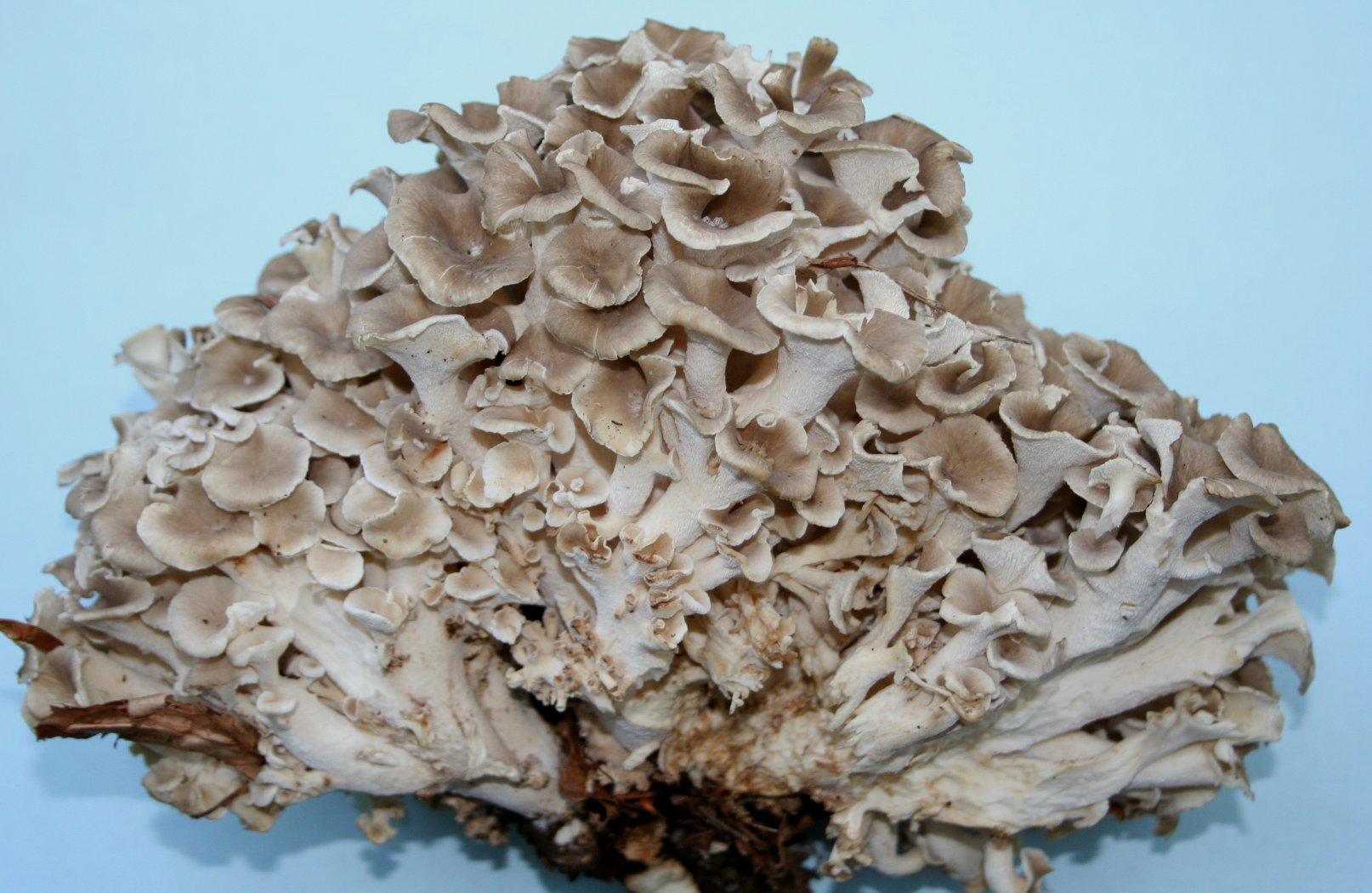
The many branched stalks

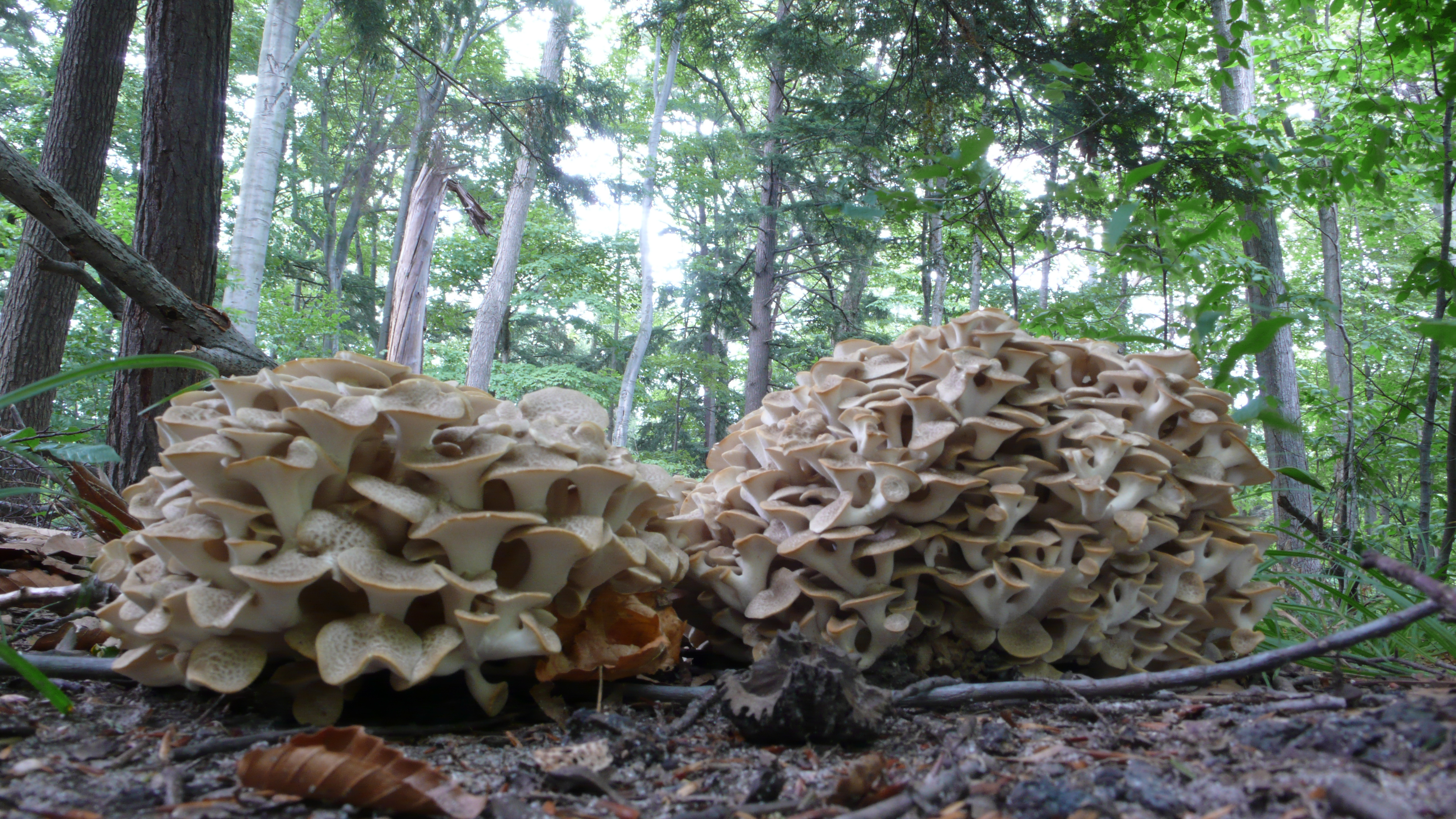
Growing in the wild

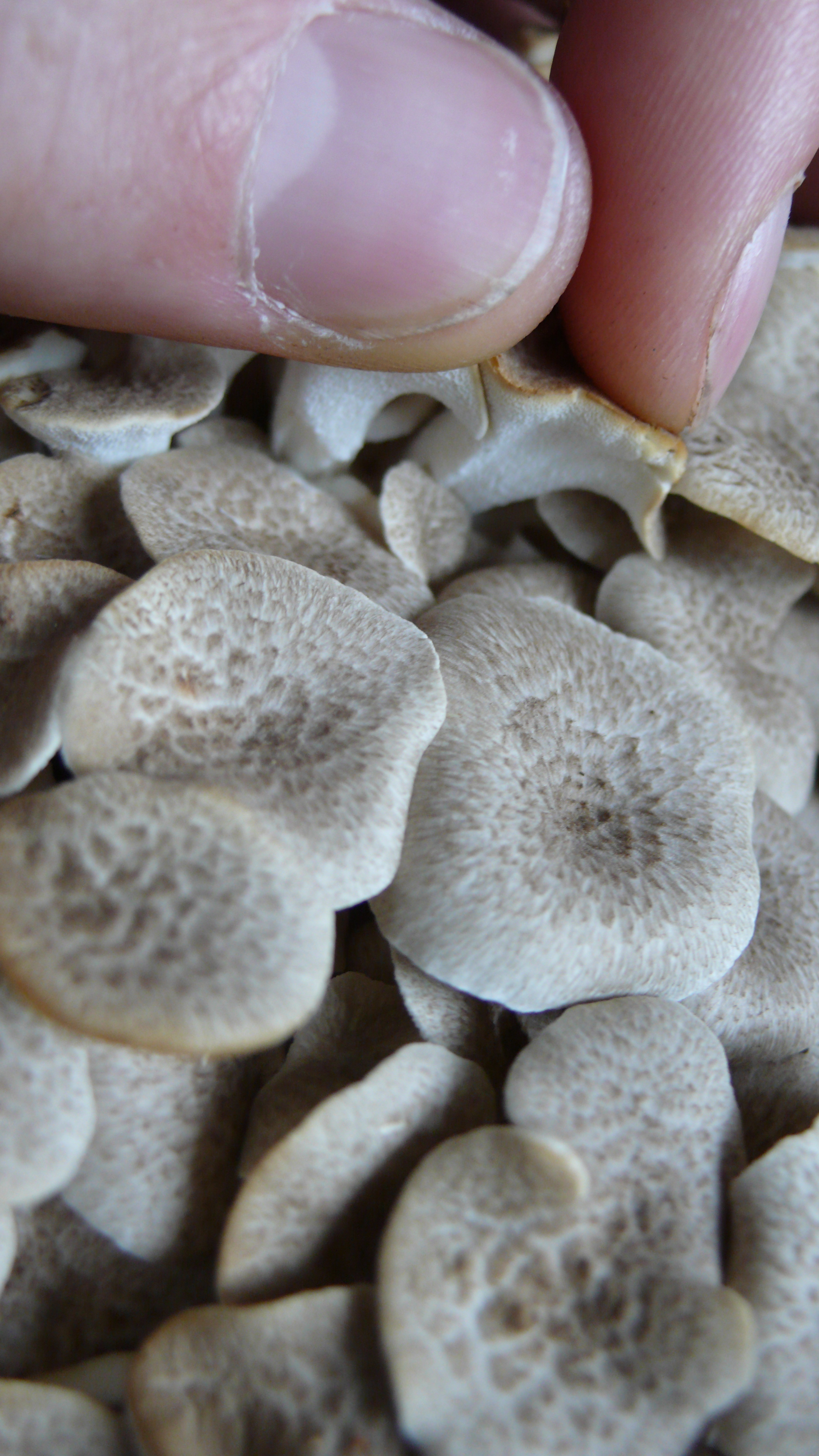
Caps

=== Similar species ===
The caps of Grifola frondosa are less consistently sized and those of Armillaria tabescens have gills.

== Habitat and distribution ==
The species grows on roots of old beeches or oak. It can be found in eastern North America from May to September.

== Uses ==
It is a choice edible mushroom.

=== Bioactive compounds ===
Polyporus umbellatus may contain bioactive compounds with immunostimulating, anticancer, anti-inflammatory, and hepatoprotective properties.

The sclerotia stage of the fungal life cycle (a compact mass of hardened fungal mycelium containing food reserves) is the one used in Chinese medicine, and a 79.74 Mb reference genome was sequenced to better understand its formation.
