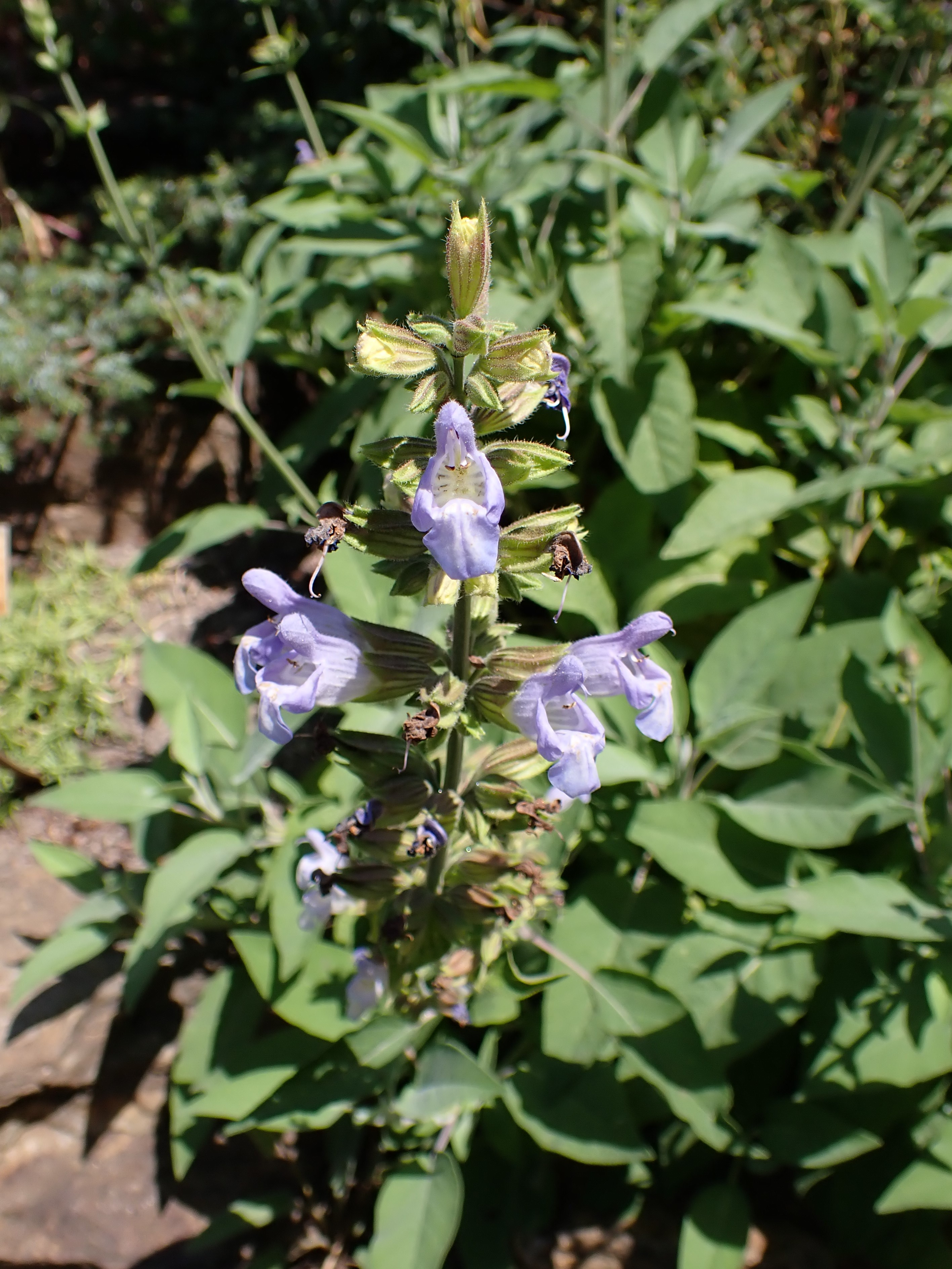

Scientific classification
- Kingdom: Plantae
- Clade: Tracheophytes
- Clade: Angiosperms
- Clade: Eudicots
- Clade: Asterids
- Order: Lamiales
- Family: Lamiaceae
- Genus: Salvia
- Species: S. tomentosa

Binomial name
- Salvia tomentosa Mill.

Synonyms
- List: Salvia brachystemon Klokov; Salvia fruticum Vuk.; Salvia grandiflora Etl.; Salvia grandiflora subsp. aegaea (Bornm.) Rech.f.; Salvia grandiflora var. aegaea Bornm.; Salvia grandiflora subsp. rotundifolia (Vis.) Rech.f.; Salvia major Garsault; Salvia nusairiensis Post; Salvia officinalis subsp. major Gams; Salvia officinalis subsp. tomentosa (Mill.) P.Fourn.; Salvia rotundifolia Vis.; Salvia trigonocalyx Woronow

= Salvia tomentosa =

Species of plant

Salvia tomentosa, the balsamic sage, is a species of flowering plant in the family Lamiaceae. It is native to the Balkan Peninsula, Crimea, Turkey, Lebanon/Syria, and the Transcaucasus, and it has been introduced to Germany. A mound-forming perennial reaching 0.5 to 1 m (2 to 3 ft), the Royal Horticultural Society considers it a good plant to attract pollinators.
