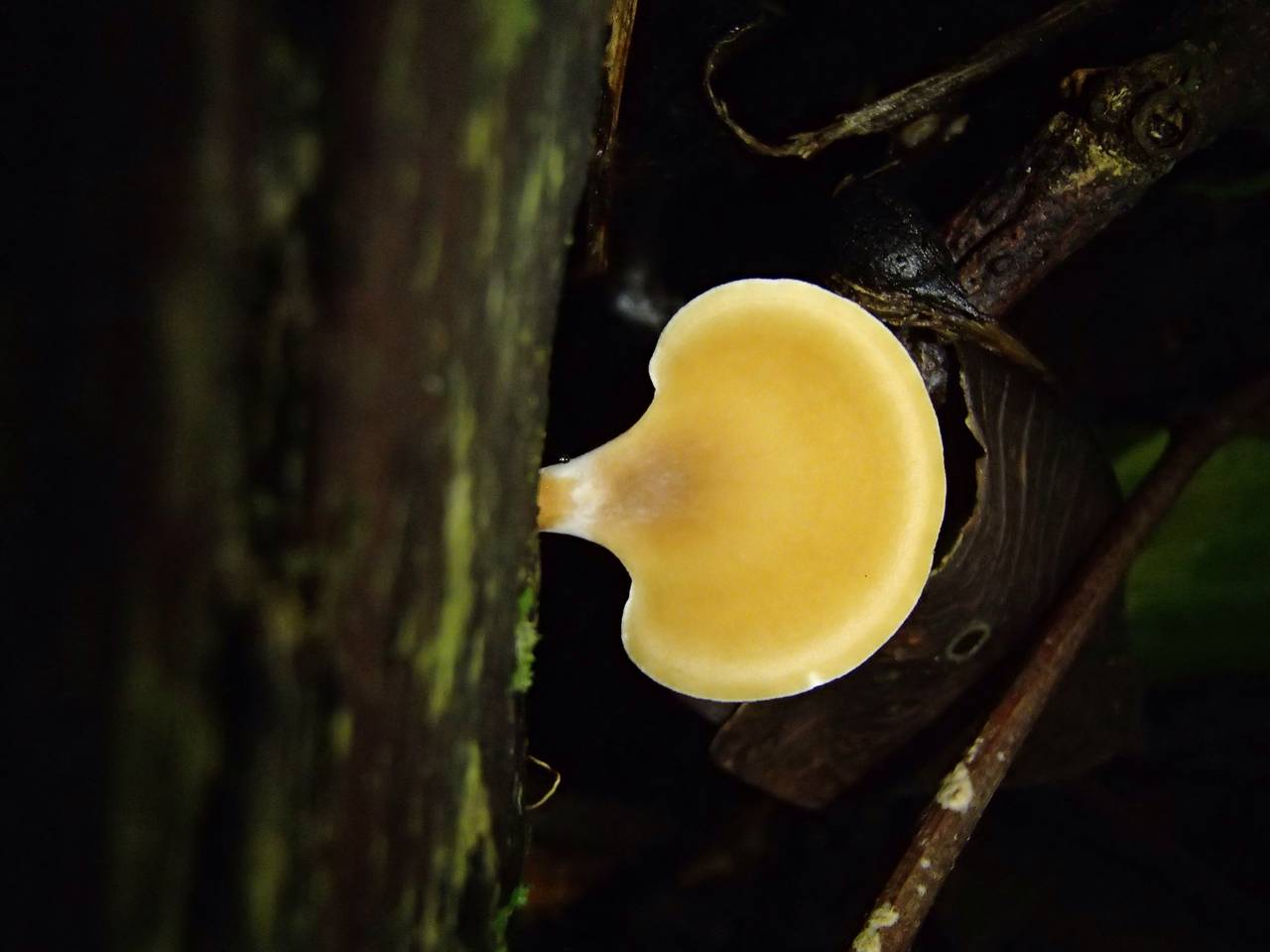

Scientific classification
- Domain: Eukaryota
- Kingdom: Fungi
- Division: Basidiomycota
- Class: Agaricomycetes
- Order: Polyporales
- Family: Polyporaceae
- Genus: Polyporus
- Species: P. leprieurii

Binomial name
- Polyporus leprieurii Mont. (1840)

Synonyms
- Polyporus tephromelas Mont. (1840); Polyporus hemicapnodes Berk. & Broome (1875); Polyporus calyculus Pat. & Gaillard (1888); Polyporus savoyanus Pat. (1891); Polyporus atripes Rostr. (1902); Polyporus pusillus Rostr. (1902); Polyporus subelegans Murrill (1907)

= Polyporus leprieurii =

Species of fungus

Polyporus leprieurii is a species of poroid fungus in the genus Polyporus. It was first described scientifically by French mycologist Camille Montagne.

It is found in tropical to subtropical areas of America and Eastern Asia, where it grows on dead hardwood that is lying on the ground, or on hanging branches.
