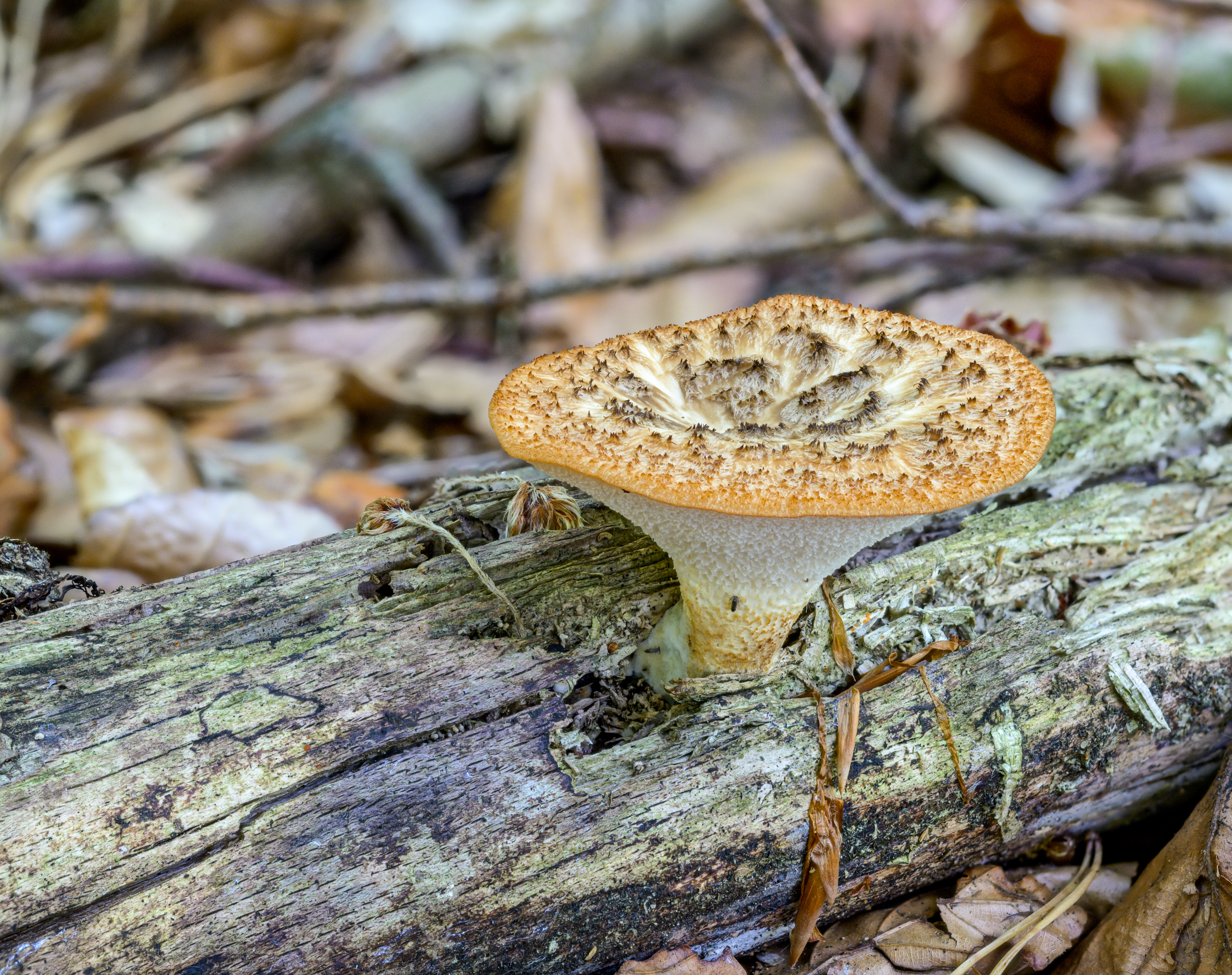

Conservation status
- Secure (NatureServe)

Scientific classification
- Kingdom: Fungi
- Division: Basidiomycota
- Class: Agaricomycetes
- Order: Polyporales
- Family: Polyporaceae
- Genus: Polyporus
- Species: P. tuberaster

Binomial name
- Polyporus tuberaster (Jacquin ex Persoon) Fries 1821

= Polyporus tuberaster =

Species of fungus

Polyporus tuberaster, commonly known as the tuberous polypore or stone fungus, is a species of fungus in the genus Polyporus. It is easily identified by the fact that it grows from a large sclerotium that can resemble buried wood or a potato.

The yellow-brown cap is 4–15 centimetres (1 1/2–6 in) wide and ranges from convex to flat and even funnel-shaped. The whitish stalks can grow upwards of 10 cm high and 2–4 cm wide. The spores and spore print are white.

The species is edible but also tough unless young and well cooked.
