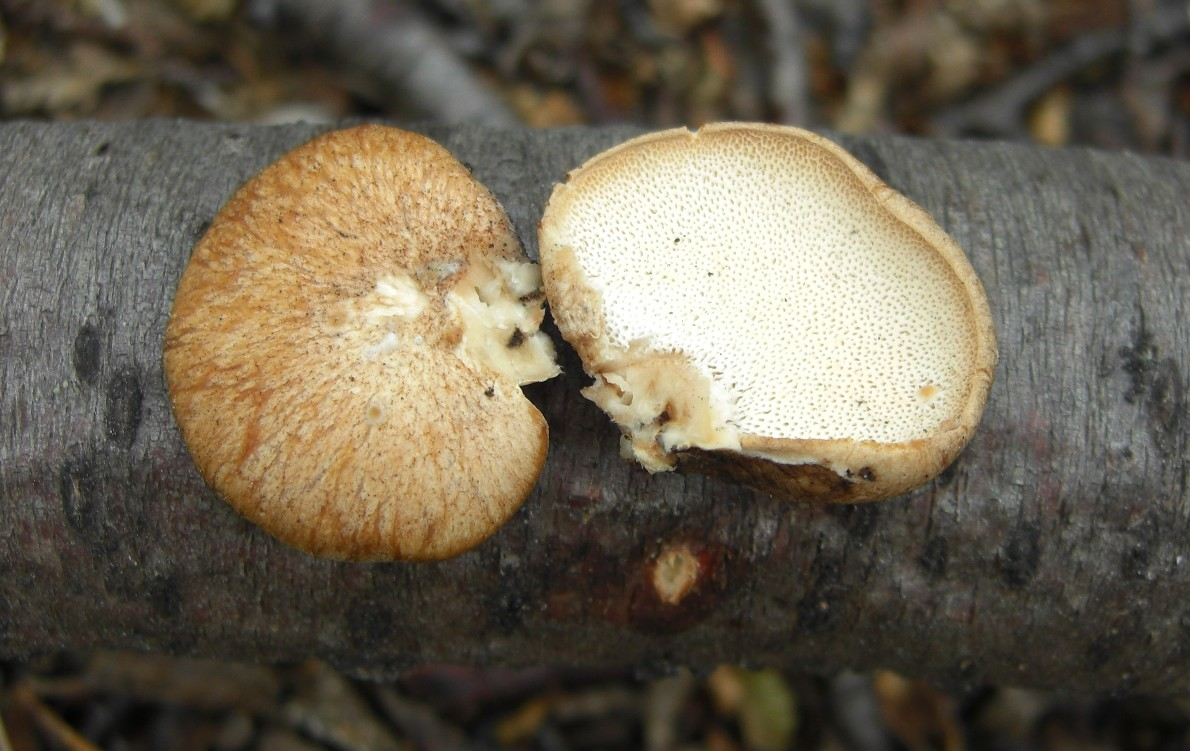

Scientific classification
- Domain: Eukaryota
- Kingdom: Fungi
- Division: Basidiomycota
- Class: Agaricomycetes
- Order: Polyporales
- Family: Polyporaceae
- Genus: Polyporus
- Species: P. gayanus

Binomial name
- Polyporus gayanus Léveillé 1846

= Polyporus gayanus =

Species of fungus

Polyporus gayanus is a species of fungus in the genus Polyporus. It was first documented in 1846 by French mycologist Joseph-Henri Léveillé.
