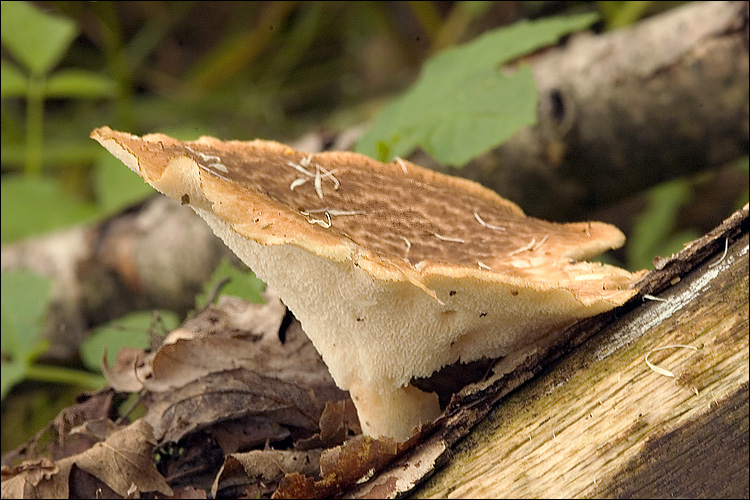
- Polyporus tuberaster

Scientific classification
- Kingdom: Fungi
- Division: Basidiomycota
- Class: Agaricomycetes
- Order: Polyporales
- Family: Polyporaceae
- Genus: Polyporus; P.Micheli ex Adans. (1763)

Type species
- Polyporus tuberaster (Jacq. ex Pers.) Fr. (1815)

= Polyporus =

Genus of fungi

Polyporus is a genus of poroid fungi in the family Polyporaceae.

== Taxonomy ==
Italian botanist Pier Antonio Micheli introduced the genus in 1729 to include 14 species featuring fruit bodies with centrally-placed stipes, and pores on the underside of the cap. The generic name combines the Ancient Greek words πολύς ("many") and πόρος ("pore").

Elias Fries divided Polyporus into three subgenera in his 1855 work Novae Symbol Mycologici: Eupolyporus, Fomes, and Poria. In a 1995 monograph, Maria Núñez and Leif Ryvarden grouped 32 Polyporus species into 6 morphologically-based infrageneric groups: Admirabilis, Dendropolyporus, Favolus, Polyporellus, Melanopus, and Polyporus sensu stricto.

The identity of the type species of Polyporus has long been a matter of contention among mycologists. Some have preferred P. brumalis, some P. squamosus, while others have preferred P. tuberaster.

== Ecology ==
"Polyporus" species have historically been listed as food for several animals, such as the pleasing fungus beetles Aporotritoma pulchra, Dacne californica, Rotitma sanguinipennis, Triplax californica, and Tritoma humeralis and T.mimetica. Whether this referred to a species nowadays still placed in this genus, or some other Polyporaceae, is rarely determinable today.

== Selected species ==
There are almost 250 species recognised including:

- Polyporus australiensis
- Polyporus gayanus
- Polyporus leprieurii
- Polyporus minutosquamosus – French Guiana
- Polyporus phyllostachydis
- Polyporus radicatus
- Polyporus tuberaster, tuberous polypore (type species)
- Polyporus umbellatus
