= Luteolin =

- The chemical structure of luteolin

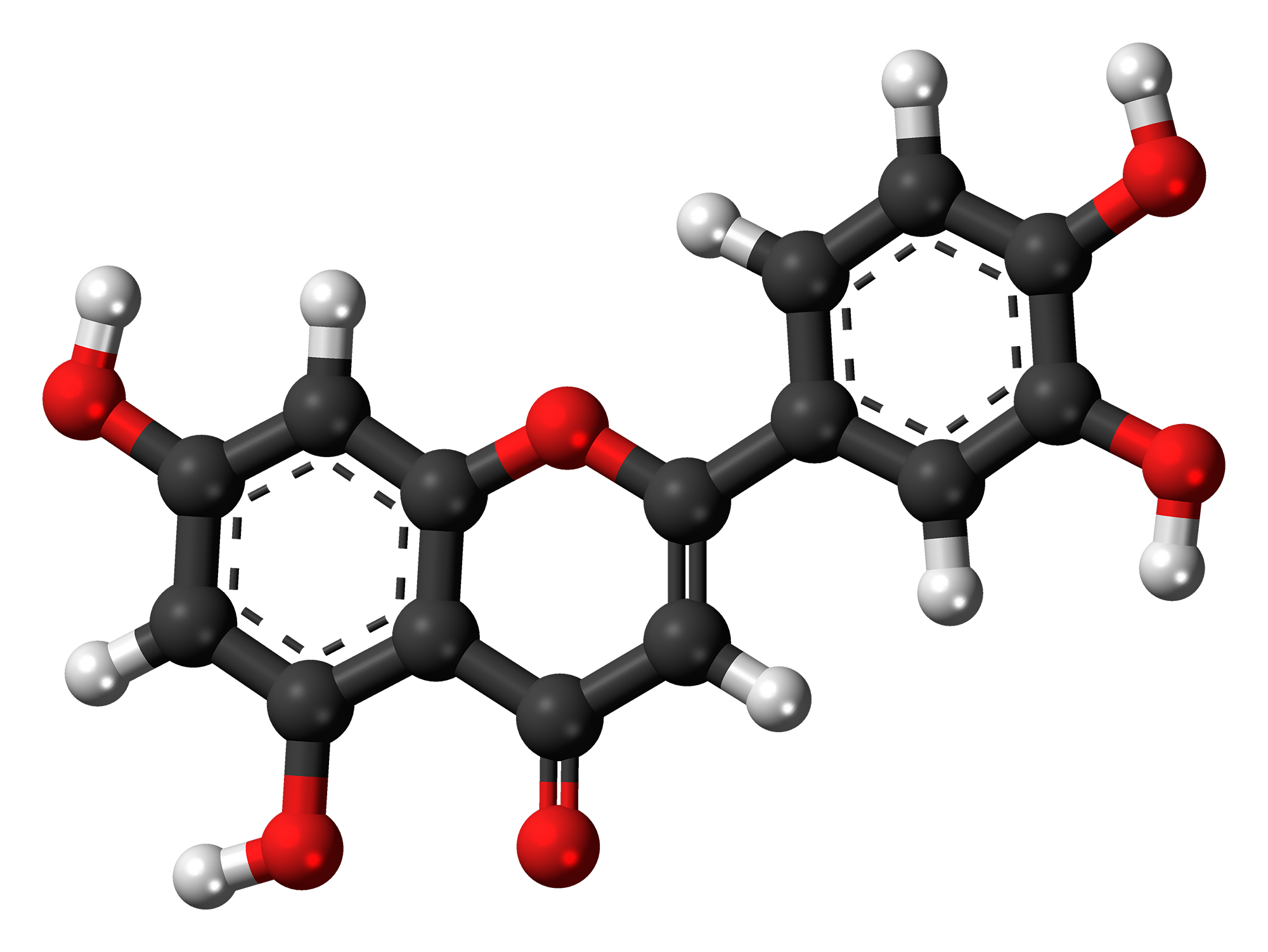

Names
- IUPAC name 3′,4′,5,7-Tetrahydroxyflavone
- Systematic IUPAC name 2-(3,4-Dihydroxyphenyl)-5,7-dihydroxy-4H-1-benzopyran-4-one
- Other names Luteolol; Digitoflavone; Flacitran; Luteoline

Identifiers
CAS Number	491-70-3
3D model (JSmol)	Interactive image
ChEBI	CHEBI:15864
ChEMBL	ChEMBL151
ChemSpider	4444102
ECHA InfoCard	100.007.038
IUPHAR/BPS	5215
KEGG	C01514
PubChem CID	5280445
UNII	KUX1ZNC9J2
CompTox Dashboard (EPA)	DTXSID4074988
- InChI: InChI=1S/C15H10O6/c16-8-4-11(19)15-12(20)6-13(21-14(15)5-8)7-1-2-9(17)10(18)3-7/h1-6,16-19H Key: IQPNAANSBPBGFQ-UHFFFAOYSA-N
- SMILES: C1=CC(=C(C=C1C2=CC(=O)C3=C(C=C(C=C3O2)O)O)O)O

Properties
Chemical formula	C_{15}H_{10}O_{6}
Molar mass	286.239 g·mol^{−1}
- Except where otherwise noted, data are given for materials in their standard state (at 25 °C [77 °F], 100 kPa). Infobox references

Luteolin is a flavone, a type of flavonoid, with a yellow crystalline appearance.

Luteolin is the main yellow dye from the Reseda luteola plant, used for dyeing since at least the first millennium B.C. Luteolin was first isolated in pure form, and was named in 1829 by the French chemist, Michel Eugène Chevreul.

Luteolin is a phytochemical present in leaves, bark, flower blossoms, pollens, various vegetables, and herbs.

== History of discovery ==
The luteolin empirical formula was determined by the Austrian chemists Heinrich Hlasiwetz and Leopold Pfaundler in 1864. In 1896, the English chemist Arthur George Perkin proposed the correct structure for luteolin. Perkin's proposed structure for luteolin was confirmed in 1900 when the Polish-Swiss chemist Stanisław Kostanecki (1860–1910) and his students A. Różycki and J. Tambor synthesized luteolin.

== Natural occurrences ==
Luteolin is most often found in leaves, but it is also present in rinds, barks, clover blossoms, and ragweed pollen. It has also been isolated from the aromatic flowering plant, Salvia tomentosa in the mint family, Lamiaceae. It is present in raw peppermint and thyme.

Other dietary sources include celery, broccoli, artichoke, green pepper, parsley, dandelion, perilla, chamomile tea, carrots, olive oil, rosemary, navel oranges, and oregano. It is present in the seeds of the palm Aiphanes aculeata.

== Research ==
Although preliminary laboratory research has been conducted on luteolin, there is no clinical evidence to indicate that its presence in consumed plant foods has any effect on human health or diseases.
