= Ethyl gallate =

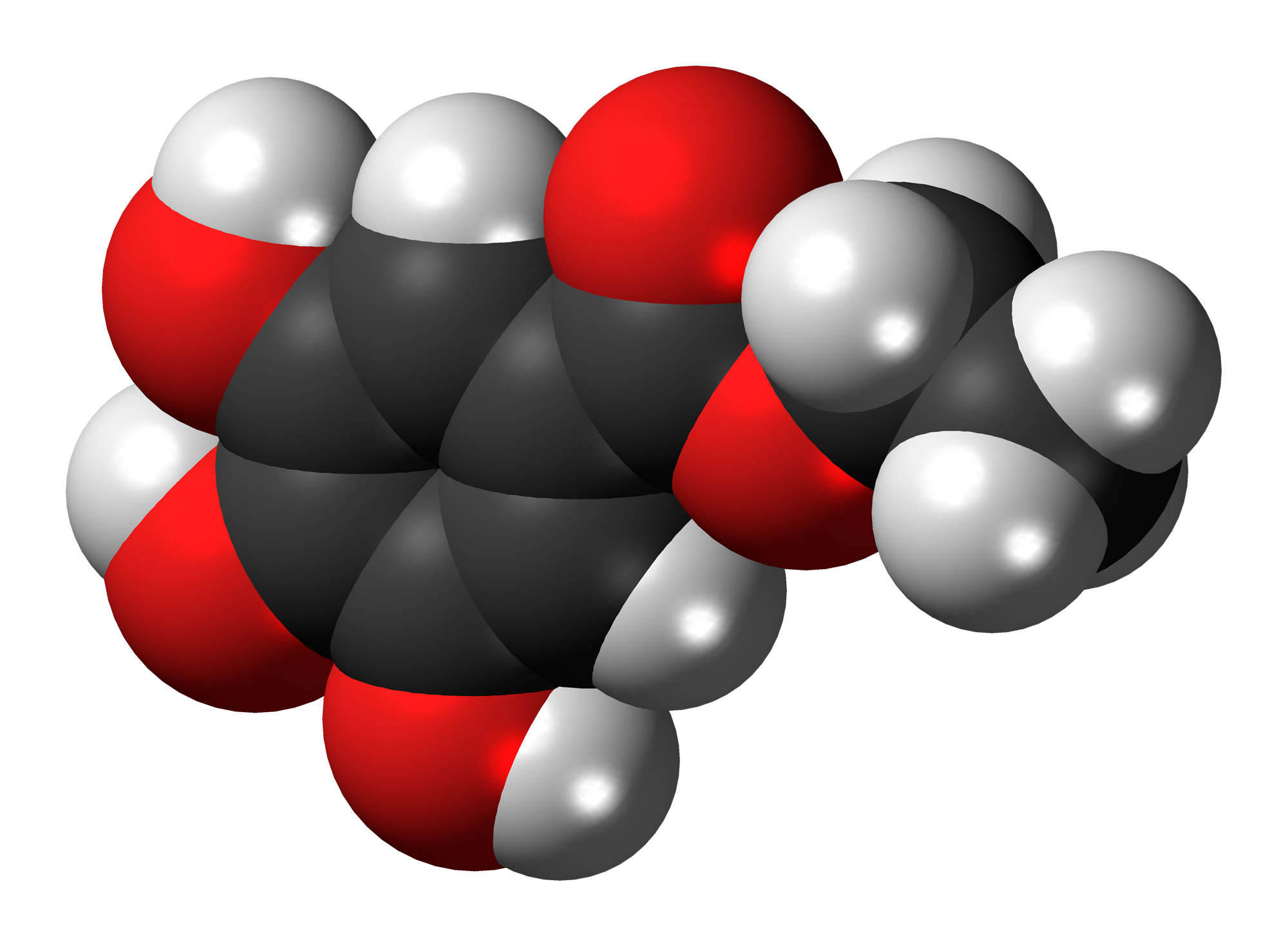

Names
- Preferred IUPAC name Ethyl 3,4,5-trihydroxybenzoate
- Other names Phyllemblin gallic acid ethyl ester

Identifiers
| CAS Number | 831-61-8 |
| 3D model (JSmol) | Interactive image |
| ChEMBL | ChEMBL453196 |
| ChemSpider | 12693 |
| ECHA InfoCard | 100.011.462 |
| E number | E313 (antioxidants, ...) |
| PubChem CID | 13250 |
| RTECS number | LW7700000 |
| UNII | 235I6UDD3L |
| CompTox Dashboard (EPA) | DTXSID2061195 |
- InChI: InChI=1S/C9H10O5/c1-2-14-9(13)5-3-6(10)8(12)7(11)4-5/h3-4,10-12H,2H2,1H3 Key: VFPFQHQNJCMNBZ-UHFFFAOYSA-N; InChI=1/C9H10O5/c1-2-14-9(13)5-3-6(10)8(12)7(11)4-5/h3-4,10-12H,2H2,1H3 Key: VFPFQHQNJCMNBZ-UHFFFAOYAR
- SMILES: CCOC(=O)c1cc(c(c(c1)O)O)O

Properties
| Chemical formula | C_{9}H_{10}O_{5} |
| Molar mass | 198.17 g/mol |
| Melting point | 149 to 153 °C (300 to 307 °F; 422 to 426 K) |
- Except where otherwise noted, data are given for materials in their standard state (at 25 °C [77 °F], 100 kPa). verify (what is ?) Infobox references

Ethyl gallate is a food additive with E number E313. It is the ethyl ester of gallic acid. Ethyl gallate is added to food as an antioxidant.

Though found naturally in a variety of plant sources including walnuts Terminalia myriocarpa or chebulic myrobolan (Terminalia chebula), ethyl gallate is produced from gallic acid and ethanol. It can be found in wine.

== See also ==
- Phenolic content in wine
