= Polyporus phyllostachydis =

Scientific classification
- Kingdom: Fungi
- Division: Basidiomycota
- Class: Agaricomycetes
- Order: Polyporales
- Family: Polyporaceae
- Genus: Polyporus
- Species: P. phyllostachydis

Binomial name
- Polyporus phyllostachydis Sotome, T. Hatt. & Kakish.

Species of fungus

Polyporus phyllostachydis is a fungus species belonging to the genus Polyporus. It is a species known from Japan to grow on the ground on the living or dead roots of the Phyllostachys edulis bamboo.
