= Isovitexin =

Names
- IUPAC name 6-(β-D-Glucopyranosyl)-4′,5,7-trihydroxyflavone
- Systematic IUPAC name 5,7-Dihydroxy-2-(4-hydroxyphenyl)-6-[(2S,3R,4R,5S,6R)-3,4,5-trihydroxy-6-(hydroxymethyl)oxan-2-yl]-4H-1-benzopyran-4-one
- Other names Homovitexin, saponaretin

Identifiers
CAS Number	38953-85-4
3D model (JSmol)	Interactive image
ChEBI	CHEBI:18330
ChemSpider	142556
ECHA InfoCard	100.126.529
PubChem CID	162350
UNII	KTQ9R9MS0Q
CompTox Dashboard (EPA)	DTXSID60952152
- InChI: InChI=1S/C21H20O10/c22-7-14-17(26)19(28)20(29)21(31-14)16-11(25)6-13-15(18(16)27)10(24)5-12(30-13)8-1-3-9(23)4-2-8/h1-6,14,17,19-23,25-29H,7H2/t14-,17-,19+,20-,21+/m1/s1 Key: MYXNWGACZJSMBT-VJXVFPJBSA-N
- SMILES: C1=CC(=CC=C1C2=CC(=O)C3=C(C(=C(C=C3O2)O)C4C(C(C(C(O4)CO)O)O)O)O)O

Properties
Chemical formula	C_{21}H_{20}O_{10}
Molar mass	432.381 g·mol^{−1}
- Except where otherwise noted, data are given for materials in their standard state (at 25 °C [77 °F], 100 kPa). Infobox references

Isovitexin (homovitexin or saponaretin) is a flavonoid, namely the apigenin-6-C-glucoside. In this case, the prefix 'iso' does not imply an isoflavonoid (the position of the B-ring on the C-ring), but the position of the glucoside on the flavone, in comparison to vitexin.

== Natural occurrence ==
Isovitexin has been found in passion flower, Cannabis, oat, and the açaí palm. Buckwheat contained the highest concentration among the sources tested.

== Metabolism ==
Isovitexin beta-glucosyltransferase is an enzyme characterised from Silene alba that forms the glucoside, 2"-O-(β-D-glucosyl)isovitexin from isovitexin and UDP-glucose.

isovitexin
+ UDP-glucose
UDP
2"-O-(β-D-glucosyl)isovitexin

Saponarin

Saponarin is a related compound where the second glucose unit is attached at the 7-position of isovitexin.

== See also ==
- Vitexin, the 8-C-glucoside of apigenin
- Isoorientin, the 3'-OH derivative
