= Vitexin =

Names
- IUPAC name 8-(β-D-Glucopyranosyl)-4′,5,7-trihydroxyflavone
- Systematic IUPAC name 5,7-Dihydroxy-2-(4-hydroxyphenyl)-8-[(2S,3R,4R,5S,6R)-3,4,5-trihydroxy-6-(hydroxymethyl)oxan-2-yl]-4H-1-benzopyran-4-one
- Other names Apigenin-8-C-glucoside

Identifiers
CAS Number	3681-93-4
3D model (JSmol)	Interactive image
ChEBI	CHEBI:16954
ChEMBL	ChEMBL487417
ChemSpider	4444098
ECHA InfoCard	100.020.876
KEGG	C01460
PubChem CID	5280441
UNII	9VP70K75OK
CompTox Dashboard (EPA)	DTXSID90190287
- InChI: InChI=1S/C21H20O10/c22-7-14-17(27)18(28)19(29)21(31-14)16-11(25)5-10(24)15-12(26)6-13(30-20(15)16)8-1-3-9(23)4-2-8/h1-6,14,17-19,21-25,27-29H,7H2/t14-,17-,18+,19-,21+/m1/s1 Key: SGEWCQFRYRRZDC-VPRICQMDSA-N
- SMILES: O=C2\C=C(/Oc1c(c(O)cc(O)c12)[C@@H]3O[C@@H]([C@@H](O)[C@H](O)[C@H]3O)CO)c4ccc(O)cc4

Properties
Chemical formula	C_{21}H_{20}O_{10}
Molar mass	432.38 g/mol
Appearance	Light yellow powder
Melting point	203 to 204 °C (397 to 399 °F; 476 to 477 K)

Supplementary data page
- Vitexin (data page)
- Except where otherwise noted, data are given for materials in their standard state (at 25 °C [77 °F], 100 kPa). Infobox references

Vitexin is an apigenin flavone glucoside, a chemical compound found in the passion flower, Vitex agnus-castus (chaste tree or chasteberry), in the Phyllostachys nigra bamboo leaves, in the pearl millet (Pennisetum millet), and in hawthorn.

== Metabolism ==
Vitexin beta-glucosyltransferase is an enzyme characterised from Silene alba that converts vitexin to its 2"-O-β-D-glucoside (flavosativaside) using UDP-glucose as the source of the added glucose unit.

vitexin
+ UDP-glucose
UDP
vitexin 2"-O-β-D-glucoside

== Properties ==
Goitrogenicity of millet flavones : vitexin inhibits thyroid peroxidase thus contributing to goiter.

== See also ==
- Isovitexin (or homovitexin, saponaretin) is the apigenin-6-C-glucoside.
- Orientin, the 3'-OH derivative
