= Isoorientin =

Names
- IUPAC name 6-(β-D-Glucopyranosyl)-3′,4′,5,7-tetrahydroxyflavone
- Systematic IUPAC name 2-(3,4-Dihydroxyphenyl)-5,7-dihydroxy-6-[(2S,3R,4R,5S,6R)-3,4,5-trihydroxy-6-(hydroxymethyl)oxan-2-yl]-4H-1-benzopyran-4-one
- Other names Luteolin-6-C-glucoside; Homoorientin

Identifiers
CAS Number	4261-42-1
3D model (JSmol)	Interactive image
ChEBI	CHEBI:17965
ChemSpider	102753
ECHA InfoCard	100.128.382
KEGG	C01821
PubChem CID	114776
UNII	A37342TIX1
CompTox Dashboard (EPA)	DTXSID50962609
- InChI: InChI=1S/C21H20O11/c22-6-14-17(27)19(29)20(30)21(32-14)16-11(26)5-13-15(18(16)28)10(25)4-12(31-13)7-1-2-8(23)9(24)3-7/h1-5,14,17,19-24,26-30H,6H2/t14-,17-,19+,20-,21+/m1/s1 Key: ODBRNZZJSYPIDI-VJXVFPJBSA-N
- SMILES: C1=CC(=C(C=C1C2=CC(=O)C3=C(C(=C(C=C3O2)O)C4C(C(C(C(O4)CO)O)O)O)O)O)O

Properties
Chemical formula	C_{21}H_{20}O_{11}
Molar mass	448.380 g·mol^{−1}
- Except where otherwise noted, data are given for materials in their standard state (at 25 °C [77 °F], 100 kPa). Infobox references

Isoorientin (homoorientin) is a flavone, a chemical flavonoid-like compound. It is the luteolin-6-C-glucoside.

== Natural occurrence ==
Isoorientin can be isolated from the passion flower, Vitex negundo, Terminalia myriocarpa, the Açaí palm, and Swertia japonica.

== Potential pharmacology ==
Isoorientin has been studied for its potential pharmacological activity. Bioassay-directed fractionation techniques led to isolation of isoorientin as the main hypoglycaemic component in Gentiana olivieri. Studies also showed that isoorientin is a potential neuroprotective compound against Alzheimer's disease.

== Metabolism ==
The enzyme isoorientin 3'-O-methyltransferase converts isoorientin to isoscoparin in a methylation reaction using the cofactor, S-adenosyl methionine (SAM):

isoorientin
+ SAM
isoscoparin
+ SAH

== See also ==
- Orientin, the 8-C glucoside of luteolin.
