= Orientin =

Names
- IUPAC name 8-(β-D-Glucopyranosyl)-3′,4′,5,7-tetrahydroxyflavone
- Systematic IUPAC name 2-(3,4-Dihydroxyphenyl)-5,7-dihydroxy-8-[(2S,3R,4R,5S,6R)-3,4,5-trihydroxy-6-(hydroxymethyl)oxan-2-yl]-4H-1-benzopyran-4-one
- Other names Lutexin, Luteolin-8-C-glucoside

Identifiers
CAS Number	28608-75-5
3D model (JSmol)	Interactive image
ChEBI	CHEBI:7781
ChEMBL	ChEMBL239559
ChemSpider	4444994
ECHA InfoCard	100.110.907
KEGG	C10114
PubChem CID	5281675
UNII	IAX93XCW6C
CompTox Dashboard (EPA)	DTXSID60182790
- InChI: InChI=1S/C21H20O11/c22-6-14-17(28)18(29)19(30)21(32-14)16-11(26)4-10(25)15-12(27)5-13(31-20(15)16)7-1-2-8(23)9(24)3-7/h1-5,14,17-19,21-26,28-30H,6H2/t14-,17-,18+,19-,21+/m1/s1 Key: PLAPMLGJVGLZOV-VPRICQMDSA-N
- SMILES: C1(=C2C(=C(C=C1O)O)C(=O)C=C(O2)C3=CC=C(O)C(=C3)O)C4OC(CO)C(C(C4O)O)O

Properties
Chemical formula	C_{21}H_{20}O_{11}
Molar mass	448.38 g/mol
- Except where otherwise noted, data are given for materials in their standard state (at 25 °C [77 °F], 100 kPa). verify (what is ?) Infobox references

Orientin is a flavone, a chemical flavonoid-like compound. It is the 8-C glucoside of luteolin.

== Natural occurrences ==
Orientin is found in Adonis vernalis, in Anadenanthera colubrina and Anadenanthera peregrina, and in the Phyllostachys nigra bamboo leaves

In food

Orientin is also reported in the passion flower, the Açaí palm, buckwheat sprouts, and in millets.

== Identification ==
The identification of orientin has been reported widely. Its identification using mass spectrometry is established.

== See also ==
Isoorientin (or homoorientin) is the luteolin-6-C-glucoside.
