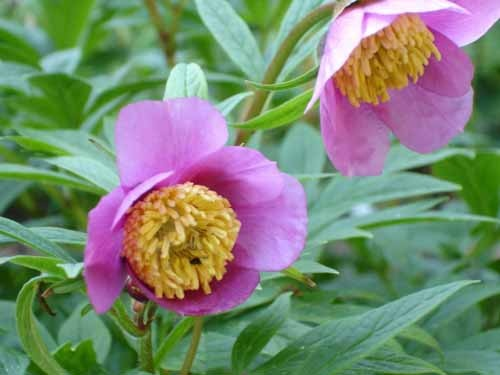

Scientific classification
- Kingdom: Plantae
- Clade: Tracheophytes
- Clade: Angiosperms
- Clade: Eudicots
- Order: Saxifragales
- Family: Paeoniaceae
- Genus: Paeonia
- Species: P. veitchii

Binomial name
- Paeonia veitchii Lynch

Synonyms
- P. beresowskii; P. veitchii var. beresowskii; P. veitchii var. leiocarpa; P. veitchii var uniflora; P. veitchii var. woodwardii

= Paeonia veitchii =

Species of flowering plant

Paeonia veitchii is a species of herbaceous perennial peony. The vernacular name in China is 川赤芍 (chuan chi shao). This species is ½-1 m high, has a thick irregular taproot and thin side roots, and deeply incised leaves, with leaflets themselves divided in fine segments. It has two to four fully developed flowers per stem, that may be pink to magenta-red or rarely almost white. It is known from central China.

== Description ==
Paeonia veitchii is a non-woody species of peony of ½–1 m high, with an irregular carrot-shaped taproot of over ½ m long and 2 cm thick, gradually getting thinner downwards and slender side roots. It has 10 chromosomes (2n=10).

=== Leaves and Stems ===
The leaves have no sheath or stipules and are alternately arranged along the stem, are divided into a leaf stalk and leaf blade. The leaf blade is twice compounded or very deeply incised, first into three leaflets, themselves palmately compounded or deeply divided (this is called biternate), each leaflet being further divided into segments that themselves are lobed, resulting in seventy to one hundred segments of ¾-3¼ cm wide.

=== Inflorescence ===
Between two and four hermaphrodite flowers fully develop on each stem, while several flowerbuds are arrested in their development, and two to five leaflike bracts are present. The flowers are somewhat nodding. Each flower has three to five leathery sepals that mostly end in a stretched tip, making it "leafy", but sometimes one and rarely two sepals may be obovate with a rounded tip, which do not fall after flowering. The corolla usually consists of six to nine oblong cyclamen to pink or rarely white petals of 3-6½ × 1½-3 cm. Towards the centre of the flower are many stamens consisting of filaments of ½–1 cm topped with anthers that ripen from the inside out, open with slits and release yellow pollen. The pollen is released in sets of four grains together. Petals and stamens are shed after flowering. The two to five carpels are initially pale yellow with reddish stigmas, but eventually become green, may be hairless or covered in soft felty hairs. Within, several large, initially red but eventually shiny black seeds of 6×4 mm develop, and each carpel opens by a slit over the entire length.

=== Differences with related species ===
Few other peony species are non-woody and have finely segmented leaves. Paeonia tenuifolia has even more divided leaves with narrowed segments of up to 6 mm wide, the basal leaves consisting of more than one hundred and thirty segments. P. veitchii however strongly resembles Paeonia intermedia, from which it can be distinguished because the latter has many spindle-shaped roots and at least the two innermost sepals are rounded. Even more morphologically alike is Paeonia anomala, which differs only from this species because it usually has only one, rarely two flowers per stem in addition to two undeveloped buds, rather than two to four fully developed flowers, in addition to few undeveloped buds.

== Taxonomy ==
=== Taxonomic history ===
Paeonia veitchi was first described by Lynch in 1909, based on a specimen collected by Ernest Henry Wilson, who collected plants for James Veitch & Sons. According to Hong and Pan, hairiness of the fruits varies in both P. anomala and P. veitchii and the only character that consistently differs between the two taxa is the usual number of fully developing flowers per stem: one for P. anomala and two to four in P. veitchii. This was the reason to propose to reduce the status of these taxa to P. anomala ssp. anomala and P. anomala ssp. veitchii respectively.

=== Modern classification ===
Although some modern literature still regards P. veitchii as a subspecies of P. anomala, recent genetic analysis has shown that P. anomala, although being a diploid, is the result of a cross between Paeonia lactiflora and P. veitchii. Morphologically, P. anomala is very similar to P. veitchii nonetheless. These species also share a common chemistry, such as specific unique anthocyanins.

=== Etymology ===
The subspecies veitchii has been named after James Veitch & Sons, a firm that contributed to the exploration of new plant species by employing plant hunters.

== Distribution and ecology ==
P. veitchii is an endemic of China, where it occurs naturally in eastern Qinghai, southern Ningxia, southeastern and central Gansu, southern Shaanxi, Shanxi, western Sichuan and the eastern rim of Tibet. It prefers relatively moist locations such as forest, grassy forest margins, between shrubs and on alpine meadows at 1800–3900 m altitude. The hermaphrodite flowers are pollinated by insects. This peony is self-fertile.
