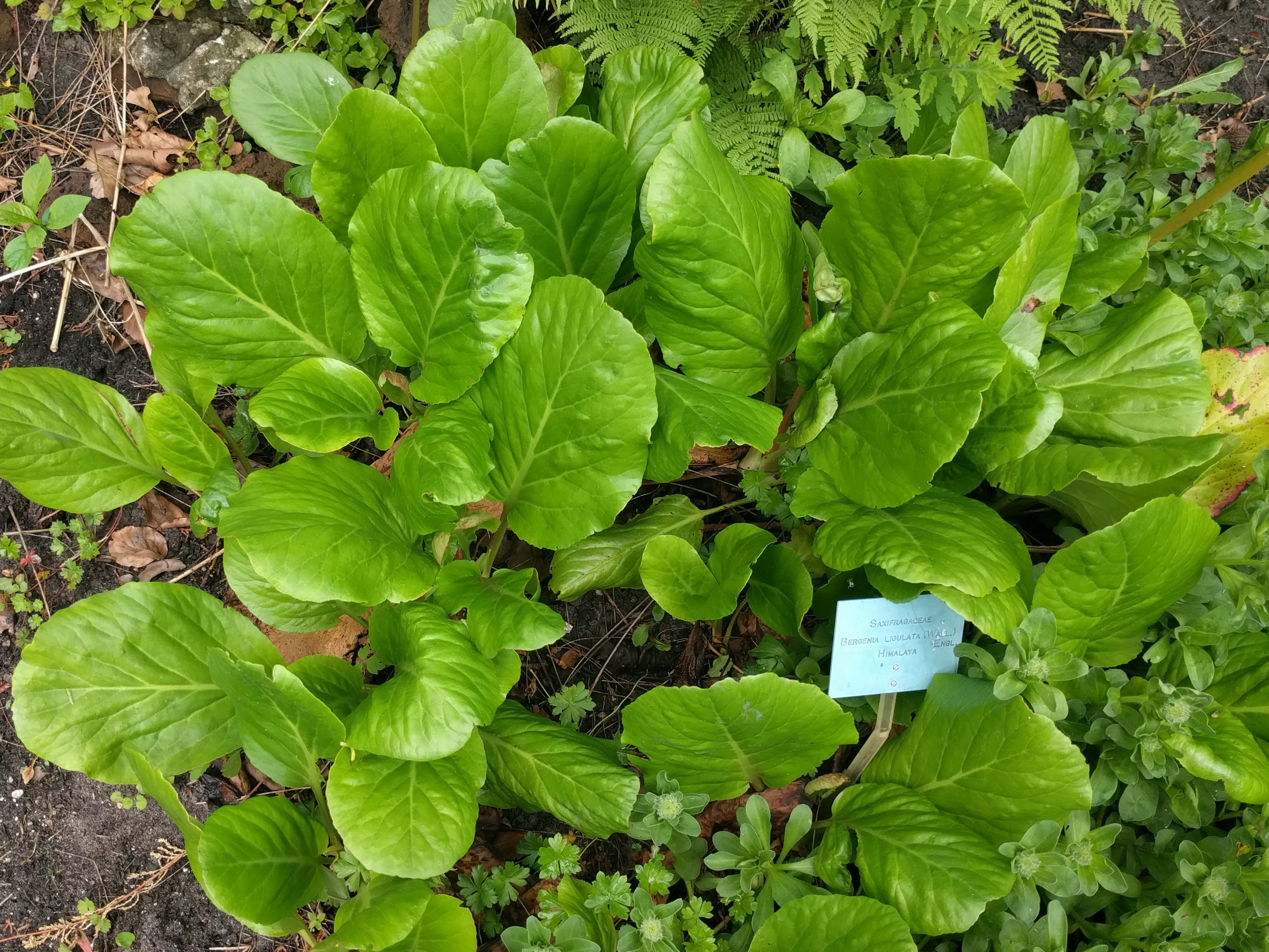

Scientific classification
- Kingdom: Plantae
- Clade: Tracheophytes
- Clade: Angiosperms
- Clade: Eudicots
- Order: Saxifragales
- Family: Saxifragaceae
- Genus: Bergenia
- Species: B. ligulata

Binomial name
- Bergenia ligulata (Wall.) Engl.

= Bergenia ligulata =

Species of plant

Bergenia ligulata (Paashaanbhed, Prashanbheda, and other spellings in Ayurveda traditional Indian medicine) is a plant belonging to the family Saxifragaceae and the genus Bergenia. It is plant is sometimes treated as a form of Bergenia ciliata. It is mostly found in temperate regions of the Himalayas from Kashmir to Bhutan and in the Khasi Hills at 1,500 m (4,900 ft) elevation.

== Chemical constituents ==
Bergenia ligulata contains a phenolic compound bergenin, and afzelechin, a type of flavan-3-ol.
