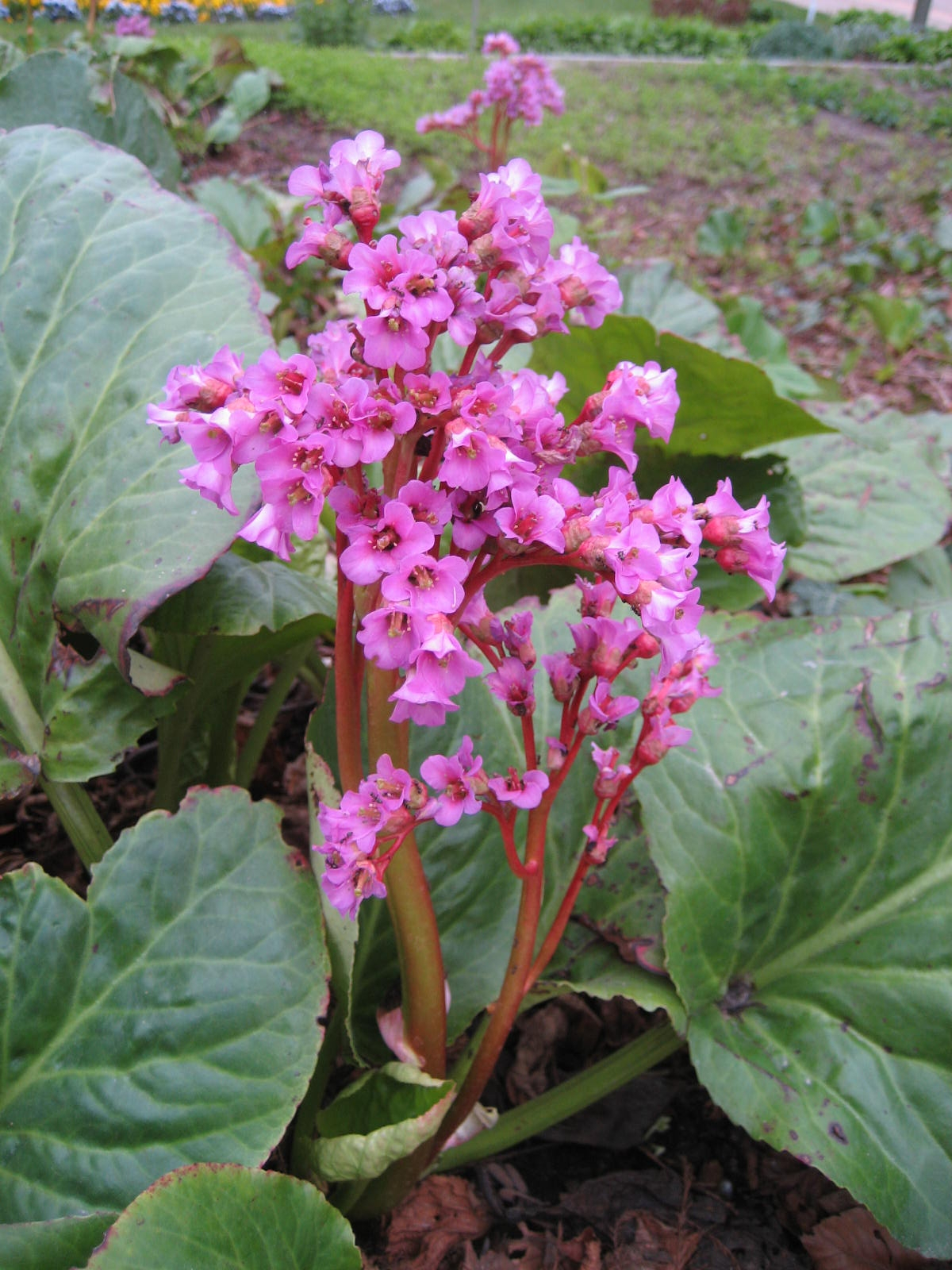
- Bergenia cordifolia

Scientific classification
- Kingdom: Plantae
- Clade: Embryophytes
- Clade: Tracheophytes
- Clade: Spermatophytes
- Clade: Angiosperms
- Clade: Eudicots
- Order: Saxifragales
- Family: Saxifragaceae
- Genus: Bergenia; Moench (1794), nom. cons.

Species
- 10; see text

Synonyms
- Megasea Haw. (1821); Piarophyla Raf. (1837)

= Bergenia =

Genus of flowering plants

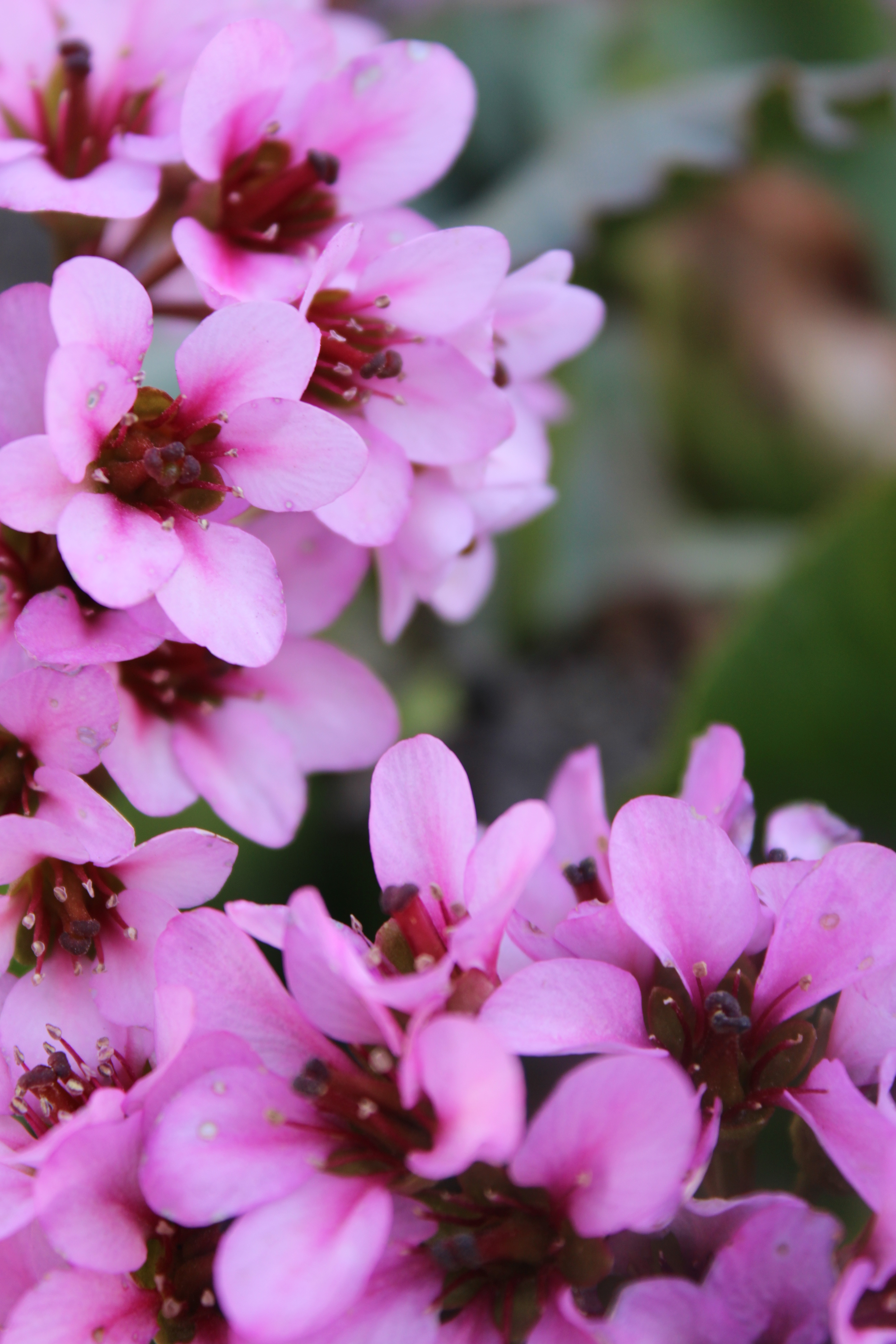
Bergenia sp.

Bergenia /bərˈɡɛniə/ (elephant-eared saxifrage, elephant's ears) is a genus of ten species of flowering plants in the family Saxifragaceae, native to central Asia, from Afghanistan to China and the Himalayan region.

== Description ==
They are clump-forming, rhizomatous, evergreen perennials with a spirally arranged rosette of leaves 6–35 cm (2.4–13.8 in) long and 4–15 cm (1.6–5.9 in) broad, and pink flowers produced in a cyme. The leaves are large, leathery, ovate or cordate, and often have wavy or saw-toothed edges. For most of the year, the leaves have a glossy green colour, but in cooler climates, they turn red or bronze in the fall. The flowers grow on a stem similar in colour to a rhubarb stalk and most varieties have cone-shaped flowers in varying shades of pink. These can range from almost white to ruby red and purple.

The common names for Bergenia are pigsqueak (due to the sound produced when two leaves are rubbed together), elephant's ears (due to the shape of the leaves) and large rockfoil.

Bergenia is closely related to Mukdenia, Oresitrophe, Astilboides and Rodgersia.

The creator of the taxonomic genus name, Conrad Moench, honoured the German botanist and physician Karl August von Bergen by coining the name Bergenia in 1794.

== Species ==
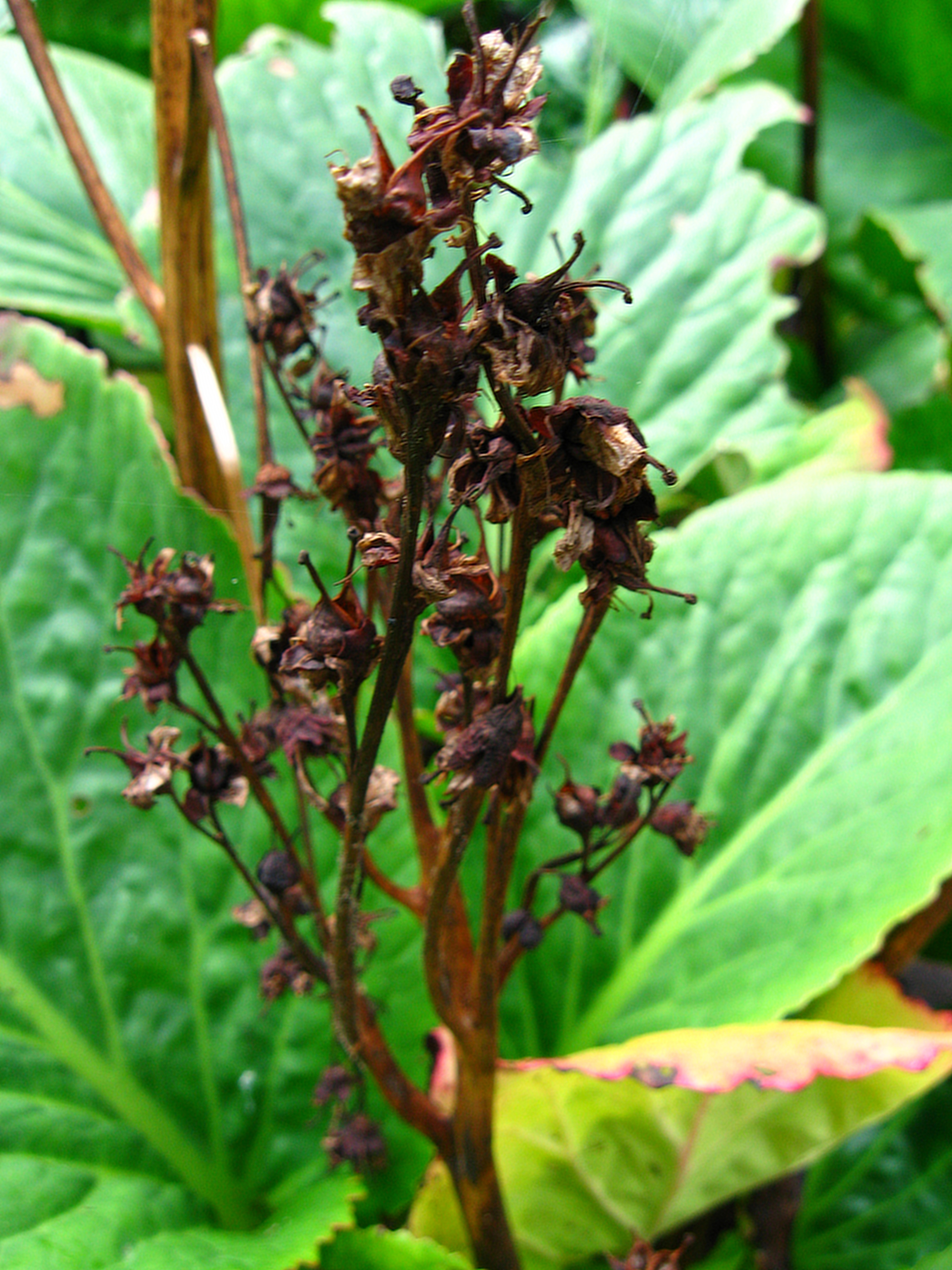
Fruit of Bergenia cordifolia

10 species are accepted.

- Bergenia ciliata (Haw.) Sternb. – western Himalayas to southwestern Nepal. Has cultivar Bergenia ciliata 'Superba'.
- Bergenia crassifolia (L.) Fritsch (syn. Bergenia cordifolia) – Kazakhstan and western Siberia to Mongolia, the Russian Far East, and Korea. The most widely grown garden plant, especially the cultivar Bergenia cordifolia 'Purpurea.' The species epithet crassifolia means thick-leaved, and cordifolia means cordate (heart-shaped) leaf (although the leaves may also be described as spoon-shaped). It grows to about 30 cm (12 in) tall. The leaves are winter hardy and change color in the range of rust brown to brown-red. Other cultivars are Bergenia cordifolia 'Winterglut', Bergenia cordifolia 'Senior', and Bergenia crassifolia 'Autumn Red'.
- Bergenia emeiensis C.Y.Wu ex J.T.Pan – central Sichuan province of south-central China
- Bergenia hissarica Boriss. – west Hisiar in Uzbekistan
- Bergenia pacumbis (Buch.-Ham. ex D.Don) C.Y.Wu & J.T.Pan (synonym Bergenia ligulata Engl.) – eastern Afghanistan to the Himalayas, Myanmar, and south-central China (western Yunnan).
- Bergenia purpurascens (Hook.f. & Thomson) Engl. – central Himalayas to Myanmar and south-central China (southwestern Sichuan and northern Yunnan). 30 – 40 cm tall with carmine-red flowers. Leaves are oval-shaped.
  - Bergenia purpurascens var. delavayi is ca. 50 cm tall with small leaves and rosy red flowers.
- Bergenia scopulosa T.P.Wang – southern Shaanxi Province of central China
- Bergenia stracheyi (Hook.f. & Thomson) Engl. – eastern Afghanistan to Tajikistan, southwestern Tibet, and Nepal. Has cultivars Bergenia stracheyi 'Alba' and Bergenia stracheyi 'Afghanica'
- Bergenia tianquanensis J.T.Pan – central Sichuan Province in China
- Bergenia ugamica V.N.Pavlov – eastern Uzbekistan

== Cultivation ==
Bergenia are hardy plants that can grow in climates with extreme temperature ranges from about −35 °F (−37 °C) to 115 °F (46 °C). They prefer sun but will grow in shady areas as well. Plants can grow to about 24 in (61 cm) tall and 24 in (61 cm) wide. They do well in most soils, but moist, humus-rich soil is preferable. Exposure and dry soils tend to stunt growth, but can enhance the winter leaf colours. In areas with cold, strong winter winds, protection from the wind may be required. They are propagated by division or rooted rhizome sections.

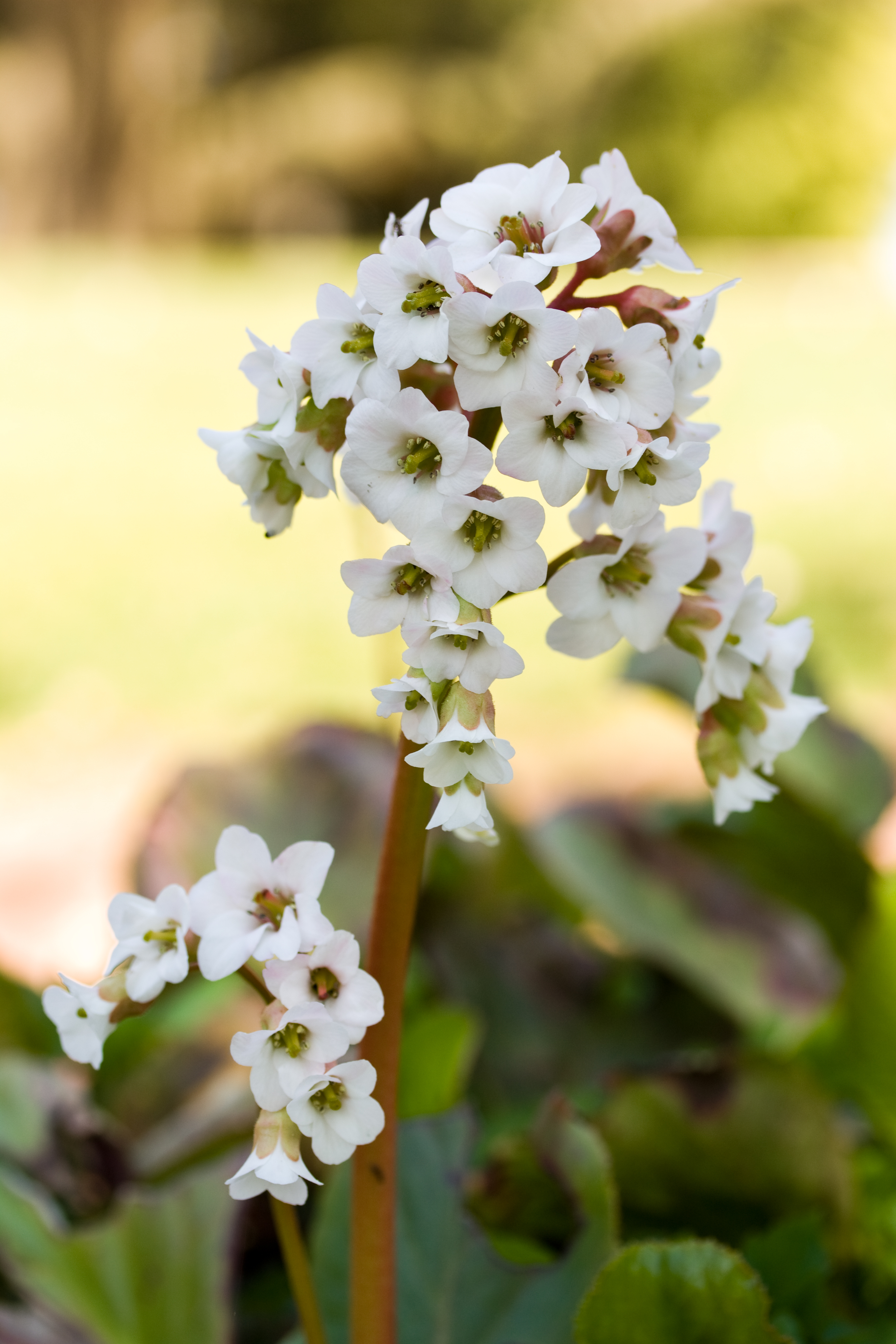
Bergenia 'Bressingham White'

Bergenia crassifolia, Bergenia cordifolia, and various hybrids are often grown in gardens, with several cultivars selected.

The following cultivars have gained the Royal Horticultural Society's Award of Garden Merit:-

- B. cordifolia 'Rosa Zeiten'
- B. purpurascens
- B. purpurascens var. delavayi
- 'Biedermeier'
- 'Bressingham White'
- 'Britten'
- 'Claire Maxine'
- 'Eden's Magic Giant'
- 'Eric Smith'
- 'Eroica'
- 'Frau Holle' (pale pink)
- 'Sunningdale'
- 'Irish Crimson'
- 'Morgenröte'
- 'Pugsley's Pink'
- 'Silberlicht'
- 'Wintermärchen'

== Pests and diseases ==
Bergenia are robust plants and generally free of problems, although vine weevil adults readily eat the edges of the leaves, resulting in an indented, 'notched' outline which can detract from the appearance of the plant.

== Uses ==
Bergenin, C-glycoside of 4-O-methyl gallic acid, and its O-demethylated derivative norbergenin, are chemical compounds and drugs of Ayurveda, commonly known as Paashaanbhed. They can be isolated from Bergenia ciliata and Bergenia ligulata and from rhizomes of Bergenia stracheyi. It shows a potent immunomodulatory effect.
