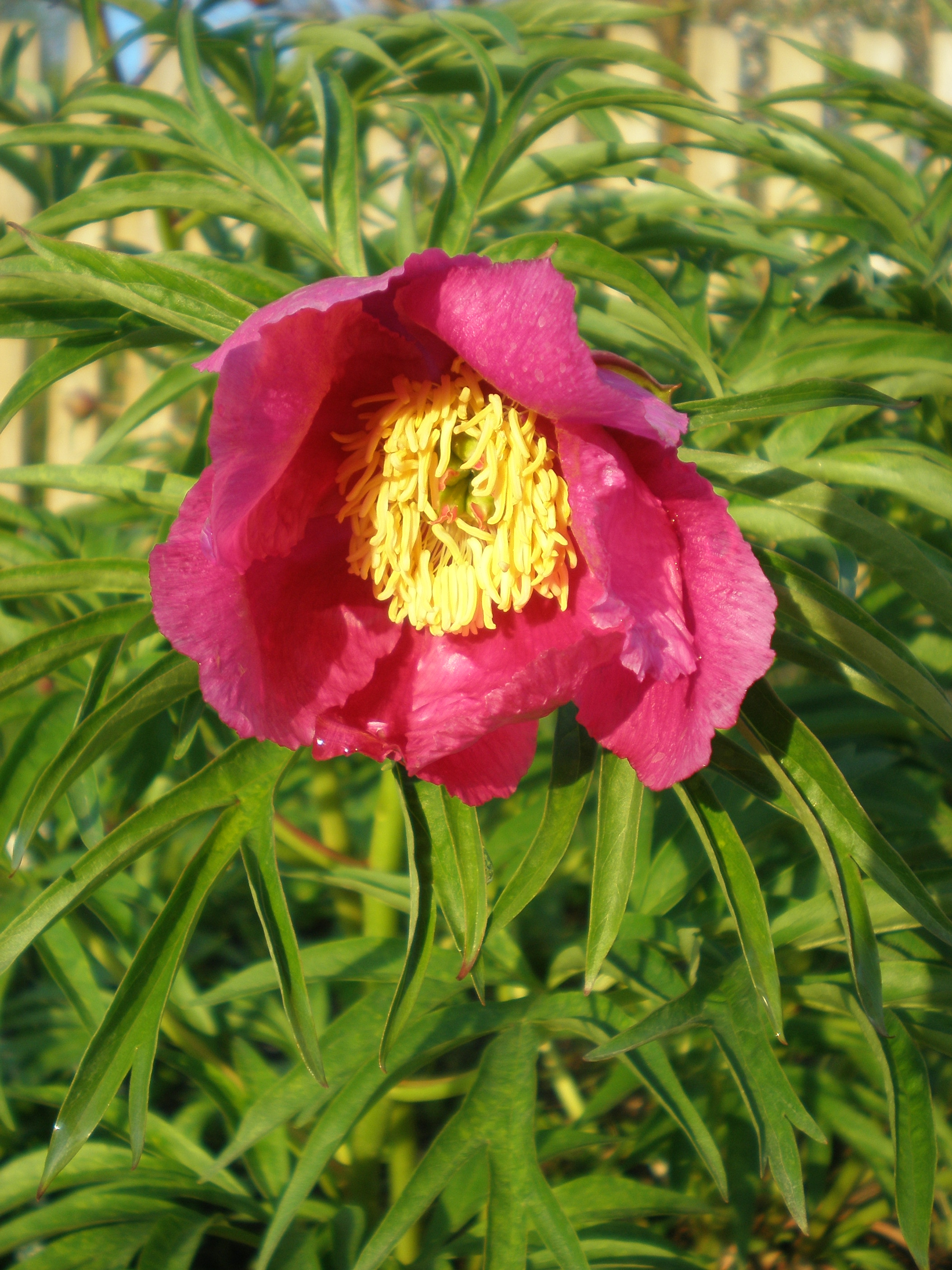

Scientific classification
- Kingdom: Plantae
- Clade: Tracheophytes
- Clade: Angiosperms
- Clade: Eudicots
- Order: Saxifragales
- Family: Paeoniaceae
- Genus: Paeonia
- Species: P. anomala

Binomial name
- Paeonia anomala L.

Synonyms
- P. altaica, P. laciniata, P. siberica, P. sinjiangensis

= Paeonia anomala =

Species of flowering plant

Paeonia anomala is a species of herbaceous perennial flowering plant in the family Paeoniaceae. This peony is ½–1 m high, with a thick irregular taproot and thin side roots. The deeply incised leaves have leaflets which are themselves divided in fine segments. It flowers in early summer, almost always with only one fully developed flower per stem, usually magenta-red or more rarely, pink or white. The species occurs in a zone between northern European Russia and northern Mongolia and south to the Tien Shan Mountains.

In garden cultivation, it requires full sun or half-shade and well-drained soil. Double-flowered forms are found in cultivation.

== Description ==
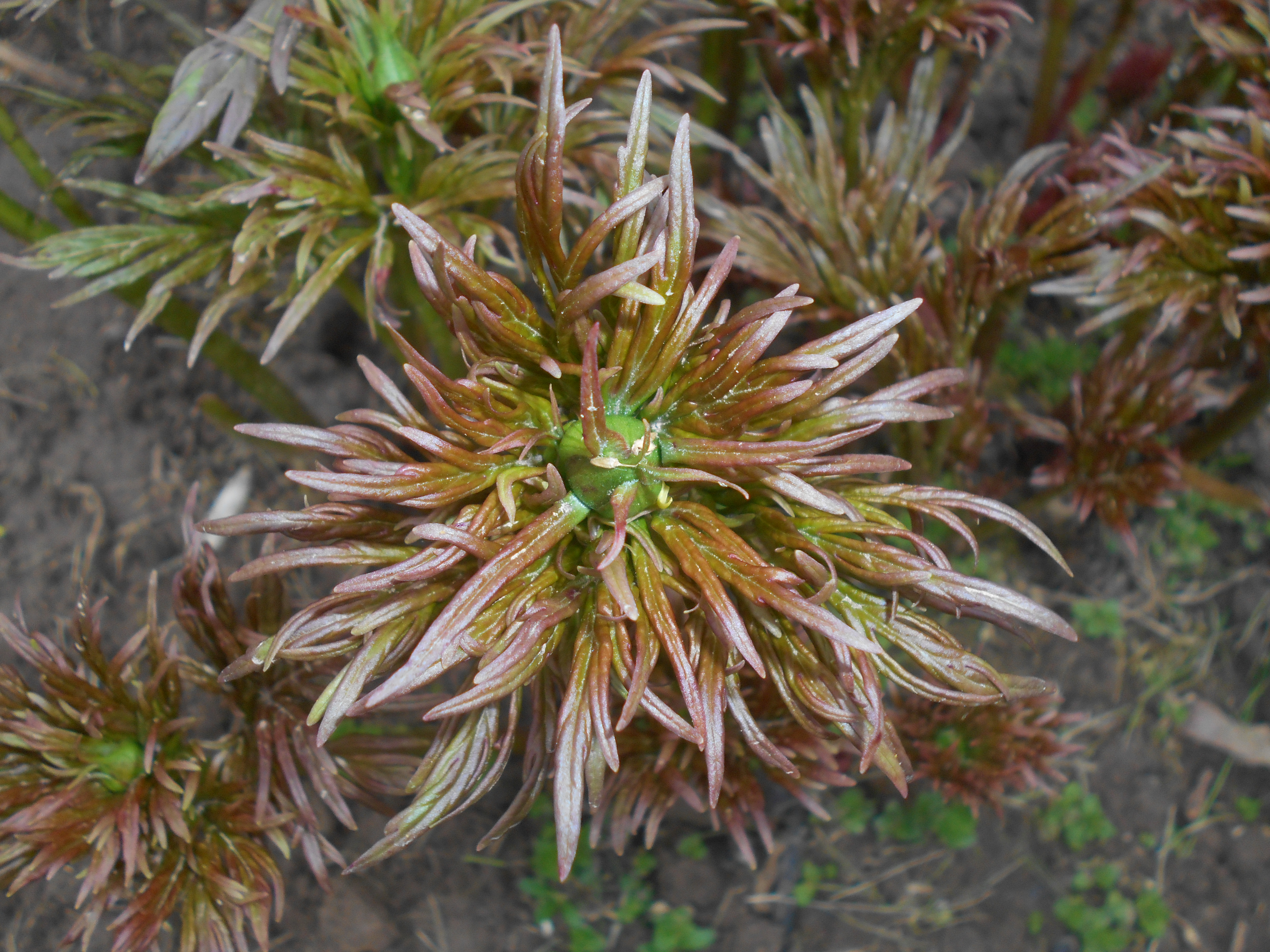
New growth with flowerbud

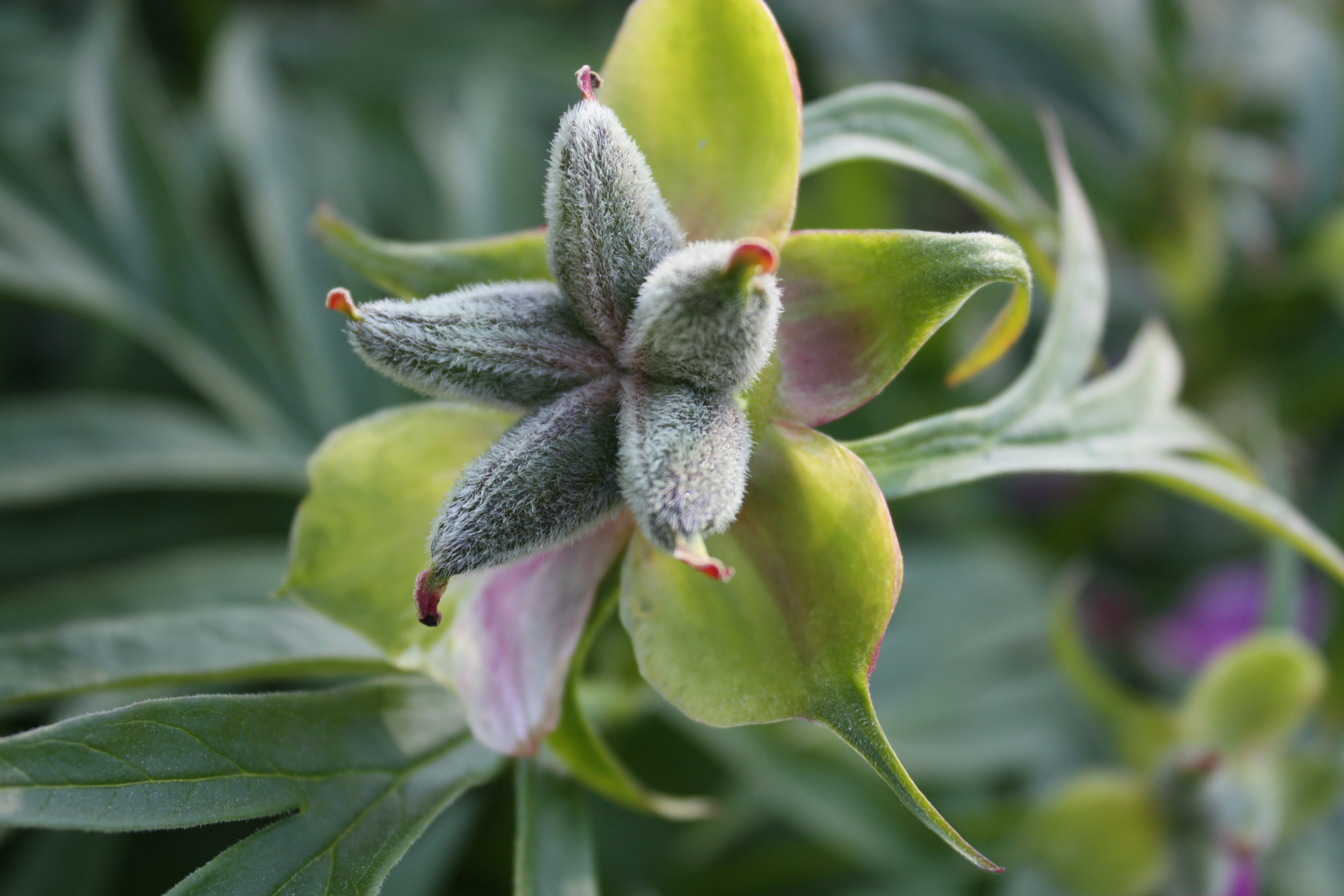
Follicles

Paeonia anomala is a non-woody species of peony ½–1 m high, with an irregular carrot-shaped taproot over ½ m long and 2 cm thick, gradually getting thinner downwards with slender side roots. Like all diploid peonies, it has 10 chromosomes (2n=10).

=== Leaves and stems ===
The leaves have no sheath or stipules and are alternately arranged along the stem, are divided into a leaf stalk and leaf blade. The leaf blade is twice compounded or very deeply incised, first into three leaflets, themselves palmately compounded or deeply divided (this is called biternate), each leaflet being further divided into segments that themselves are lobed, resulting in seventy to one hundred segments of ¾–3¼ cm wide. At the end of the growing season the leaves may turn vivid red.

=== Inflorescence ===
One or very rarely two hermaphrodite flowers fully develop on each stem, while one or two flowerbuds are arrested in their development, and two to five leaflike bracts are present. The flowers are somewhat nodding. Each flower has three to five leathery sepals that mostly end in a stretched tip, making it "leafy", but sometimes one and rarely two sepals may be obovate with a rounded tip, which do not fall after flowering. The corolla usually consists of six to nine oblong cyclamen or rarely pink to white petals of 3–6½ × 1½–3 cm. Towards the centre of the flower are many stamens consisting of filaments of ½–1 cm topped with anthers that ripen from the inside out, open with slits and release yellow pollen. The pollen is released in sets of four grains together. Dependent on latitude and altitude flowers open between April and July and are said to smell like lily of the valley. Petals and stamens are shed after flowering. The two to five carpels are initially pale yellow with reddish stigmas, but eventually become green, may be hairless or covered in soft felty hairs. Within, several large, initially red but eventually shiny black seeds of 6×4 mm develop, and each carpel opens by a slit over the entire length. Ripe seedheads may be present during August and September.

=== Differences with related species ===
Few other peony species are non-woody and have finely segmented leaves. Paeonia tenuifolia has even more divided leaves with narrowed segments of up to 6 mm wide, the basal leaves consisting of more than one hundred and thirty segments. Paeonia emodi has about 15 entire segments per basal leaf. P. anomala however strongly resembles Paeonia intermedia, from which it can be distinguished because the latter has many spindle-shaped roots and at least the two innermost sepals are rounded. Even more morphologically alike is Paeonia veitchii which differs only from this species because it usually has two to four flowers per stem in addition to two undeveloped buds, rather than only one flower, rarely two, in addition to few undeveloped buds.

== Taxonomy ==
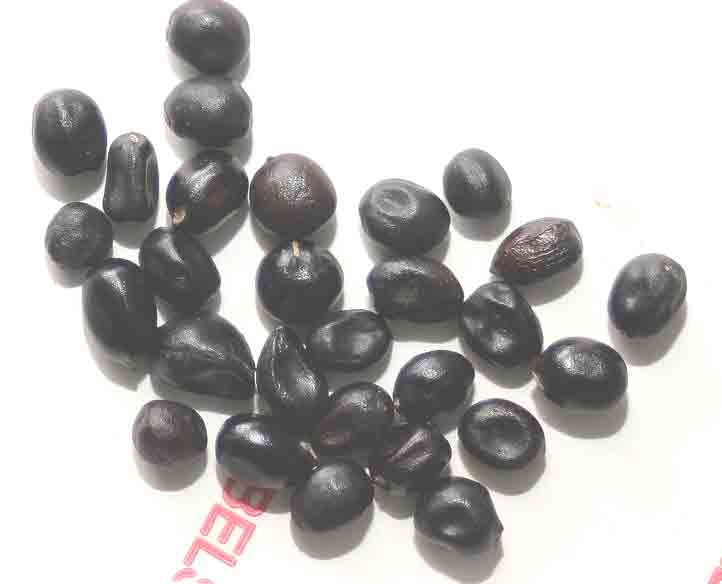
seeds

=== Taxonomic history ===
Paeonia anomala was first described by Carl Linnaeus in 1771, based on a plant from Siberia. Pallas described in 1789 three further species, P. laciniata and P. siberiaca also from Siberia, and P. hybrida which developed from seed supposedly from a specimen of P. tenuifolia in the Saint Petersburg Botanical Garden. In 1818 Anderson merely recognized P. anomala, considering P. hybrida a synonym of P. tenuifolia. In the same year Augustin Pyramus de Candolle distinguished between P. laciniata, P. anomala and P. hybrida, but synonymized P. laciniata with P. anomala in 1824. In 1830 Meyer named a fourth species, P. intermedia, that had been collected in the Altai Mountains. Ledebour (1842) cited P. hybrida and P. intermedia, but treated P. laciniata as a synonym of P. anomala. Von Trautvetter in 1860 thought there was but one species, and treated P. hybrida as a variety of P. anomala, while considering P. intermedia as a form within that variety. The widest delineation of P. anomala was made by Ernst Huth in 1892 who included var. typica, var. hybrida (now P. intermedia), var. nudicarpa, and var. emodi (now P. emodi). Krylov in 1901 thought there were two species, P. anomala, and P. hybrida consisting of var. hybrida and var. intermedia. In 1904 Trautvetter treated P. intermedia as a subspecies of P. anomala. Nikolai Schipczinsky grouped P. anomala, P. hybrida and as its variety intermedia together in the series Dentatae with the common character "leaf lobes incised or with dentate margin" in the 1937 Flora of the USSR. Stern acknowledged one species, P. anomala with two varieties: anomala with hairless fruits and intermedia with soft hairs. According to Hong and Pan, hairiness of the fruits varies in both P. anomala and P. veitchii and the only character that consistently differs between the two taxa is the usual number of fully developing flowers per stem: one for P. anomala and two to four in P. veitchii. This was the reason to propose to reduce the status of these taxa to P. anomala ssp. anomala and P. anomala ssp. veitchii respectively.

=== Modern classification ===
Although some modern literature still regards P. veitchii as a subspecies of P. anomala, recent genetic analysis has shown that P. anomala, although being a diploid, is the result of a cross between Paeonia lactiflora and P. veitchii. Morphologically, P. anomala is very similar to P. veitchii nonetheless, and very different from P. lactiflora. P. anomala and P. veitchii also share a common chemistry, such as specific unique anthocyanins.

=== Etymology ===
The species name anomala, meaning "deviant" is said to refer to the autumn color, which is unique among peonies.

== Distribution and ecology ==
P. anomala is known from Russia, ranging from the Kola Peninsula to the Altai Republic and Lake Baikal, northeastern Kazakhstan, China (northwest Xinjiang) and northern Mongolia. It has become naturalized in Finland. It grows in relatively moist circumstances like coniferous and deciduous forests, valleys and meadows, at the southern end at 1000–2500 m altitude, but further north down to sea level. Its northernmost population in the Taz River valley, grows in a forest with dwarfed trees like Larix sibirica, Betula pubescens, Alnus viridis subsp. fruticosa, Sorbus aucuparia subsp. sibirica, shrubs like Rosa majalis, Lonicera pallasii, Ribes spicatum subsp. hispidulum, and grasses like Calamagrostis canescens.

P. anomala is self-fertile. Mammals, such as deer or rabbits do not eat it.

== Cultivation ==
P. anomala used to be grown in botanical gardens, but is now becoming available for gardeners as an ornamental. It is easy to grow and prefers a neutral or slightly alkaline, deep rich soil, but is also coping with lime. It does equally well in sun or dapple shade. Plants are intolerant of waterlogged or very dry soil. On sandy soils plants generally produce more leaves and less flowers. As can be expected from a species from Siberia, it survives temperatures down to at least −25 °C. The plants have good ornamental value and may survive in gardens for at least 50 years. This peony inhibits the growth of adjacent plants, especially legumes. All peonies dislike disturbance of their roots, and need time to recover after being replanted or divided.

== Use ==
In the late 19th century, P. anomala roots were eaten raw and crumbled in soup in the North-West of Siberia by the Khakas people. In Mongolia, fruits and roots of Paeonia anomala are used to treat lower abdominal pain, indigestion, kidney diseases, nocturnal enuresis, bleeding, blood clotting, exhaustion and respiratory diseases in traditional medicine. Extract of the fruit protects against oxidative stress, by free radical scavenging, higher glutathione concentrations in the cells, and inhibiting damage to the DNA. Compounds such as ellagic acid, methyl gallate, ethyl gallate, fischeroside B, and quercetin derivatives are responsible for this protection.
