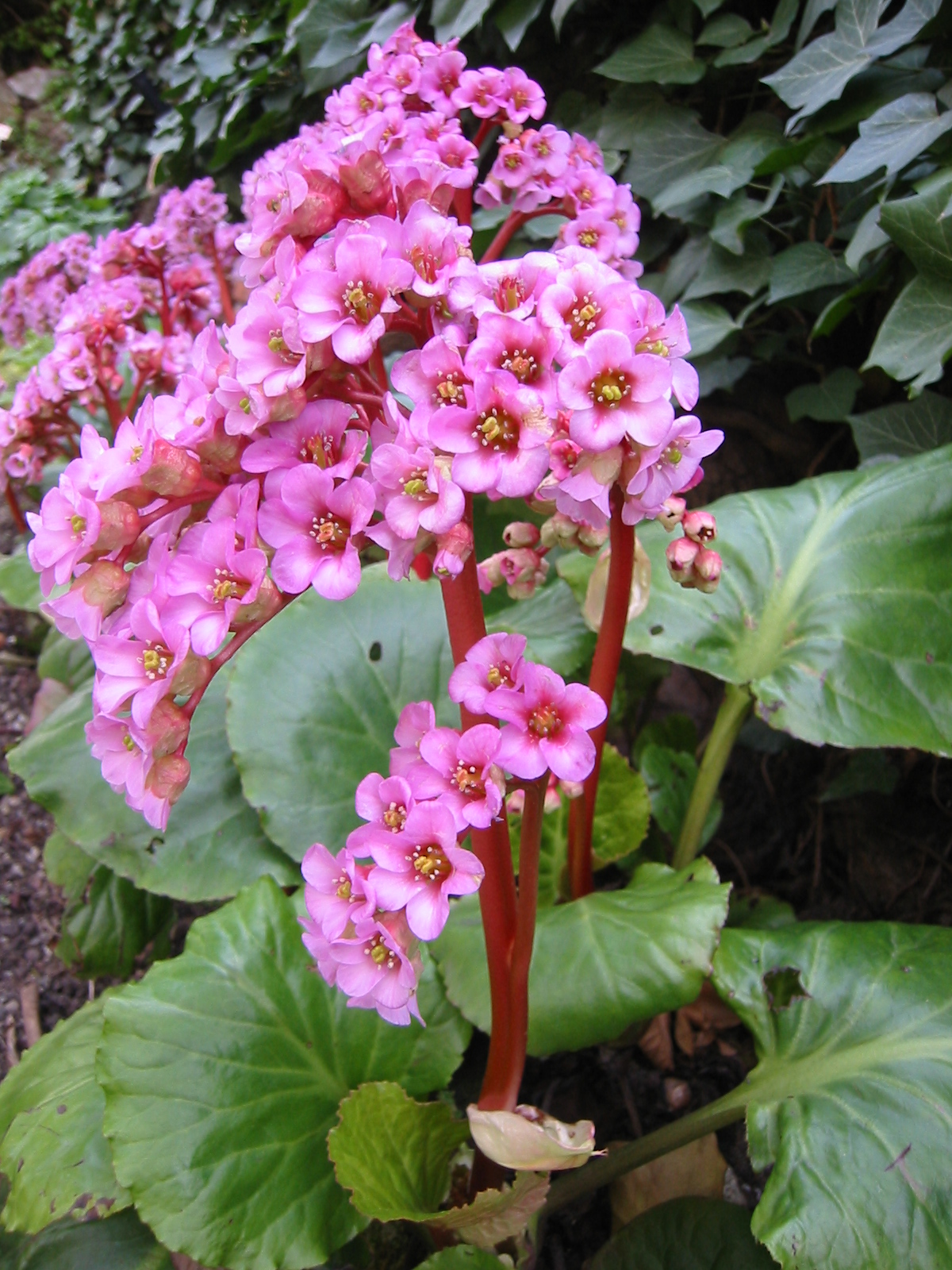
- In bloom
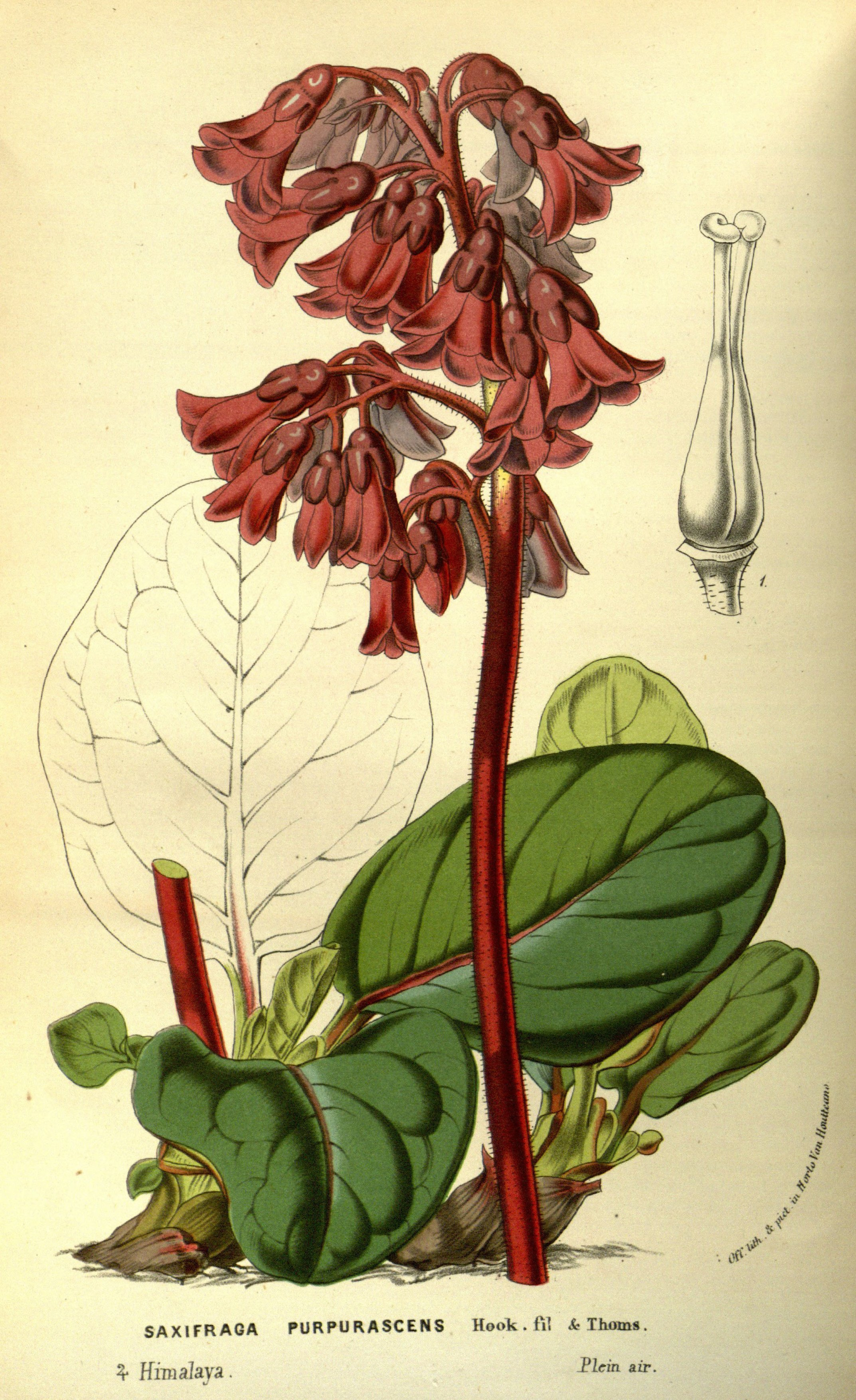
- Botanical illustration

Scientific classification
- Kingdom: Plantae
- Clade: Tracheophytes
- Clade: Angiosperms
- Clade: Eudicots
- Order: Saxifragales
- Family: Saxifragaceae
- Genus: Bergenia
- Species: B. purpurascens

Binomial name
- Bergenia purpurascens (Hook.f. & Thomson) Engl.

Synonyms
- Bergenia delavayi (Franch.) Engl.; Saxifraga delavayi Franch.; Saxifraga purpurascens Hook.f. & Thomson

= Bergenia purpurascens =

Species of flowering plant

Bergenia purpurascens, the purple bergenia, is a species of flowering plant in the family Saxifragaceae. It is a perennial herb and is native to Nepal, the eastern Himalayas, Assam, Tibet, south-central China, and Myanmar. The species, its putative variety Bergenia purpurascens var. delavayi, and its cultivar 'Irish Crimson' have all gained the Royal Horticultural Society's Award of Garden Merit. A useful feature in the garden is the visual interest that its foliage provides by turning a deep beet red during the winter. The Latin specific epithet purpurascens is in reference to the foliage that is purple in color.
