= Bergenin =

- Chemical structure of bergenin

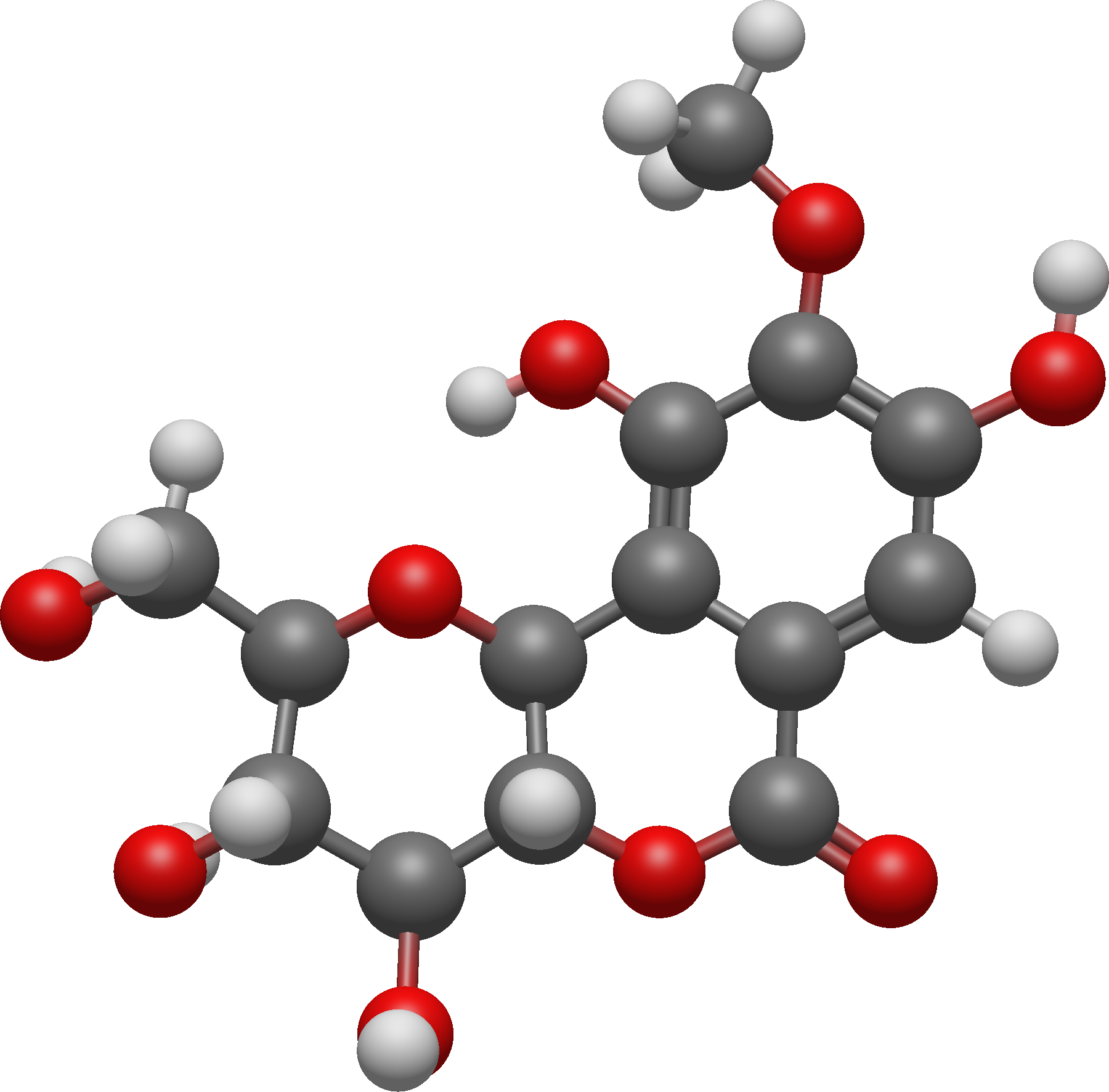
- Chemical structure of bergenin in ball-and-stick format

Names
- Preferred IUPAC name (2R,3S,4S,4aR,10bS)-3,4,8,10-Tetrahydroxy-2-(hydroxymethyl)-9-methoxy-3,4,4a,10b-tetrahydropyrano[3,2-c][2]benzopyran-6(2H)-one
- Other names Cuscutin

Identifiers
CAS Number	477-90-7 (anhydrous); 5956-63-8 (unspecified hydrate)
3D model (JSmol)	Interactive image
ChEMBL	ChEMBL273019
ChemSpider	59455
ECHA InfoCard	100.230.534
PubChem CID	66065
UNII	L84RBE4IDC
CompTox Dashboard (EPA)	DTXSID4048141
- InChI: InChI=1S/C14H16O9/c1-21-11-5(16)2-4-7(9(11)18)12-13(23-14(4)20)10(19)8(17)6(3-15)22-12/h2,6,8,10,12-13,15-19H,3H2,1H3/t6-,8-,10+,12+,13-/m1/s1 Key: YWJXCIXBAKGUKZ-HJJNZUOJSA-N
- SMILES: OC[C@@H](O1)[C@@H](O)[C@H](O)[C@@H]2[C@@H]1c3c(O)c(OC)c(O)cc3C(=O)O2

Properties
Chemical formula	C_{14}H_{16}O_{9}
Molar mass	328.27 g/mol
- Except where otherwise noted, data are given for materials in their standard state (at 25 °C [77 °F], 100 kPa). verify (what is ?) Infobox references

Bergenin, alias cuscutin, is trihydroxybenzoic acid glycoside. It is the C-glycoside of 4-O-methyl gallic acid. It possesses an O-demethylated derivative called norbergenin. These are chemical compounds and drugs of Ayurveda, commonly known as Paashaanbhed. It shows a potent immunomodulatory effect.

Bergenin can be isolated from Bergenia species like Bergenia ciliata and Bergenia ligulata, from rhizomes of Bergenia stracheyi. It is also found in the stem bark of Dryobalanops aromatica, in Ardisia elliptica and in Mallotus japonicus.
