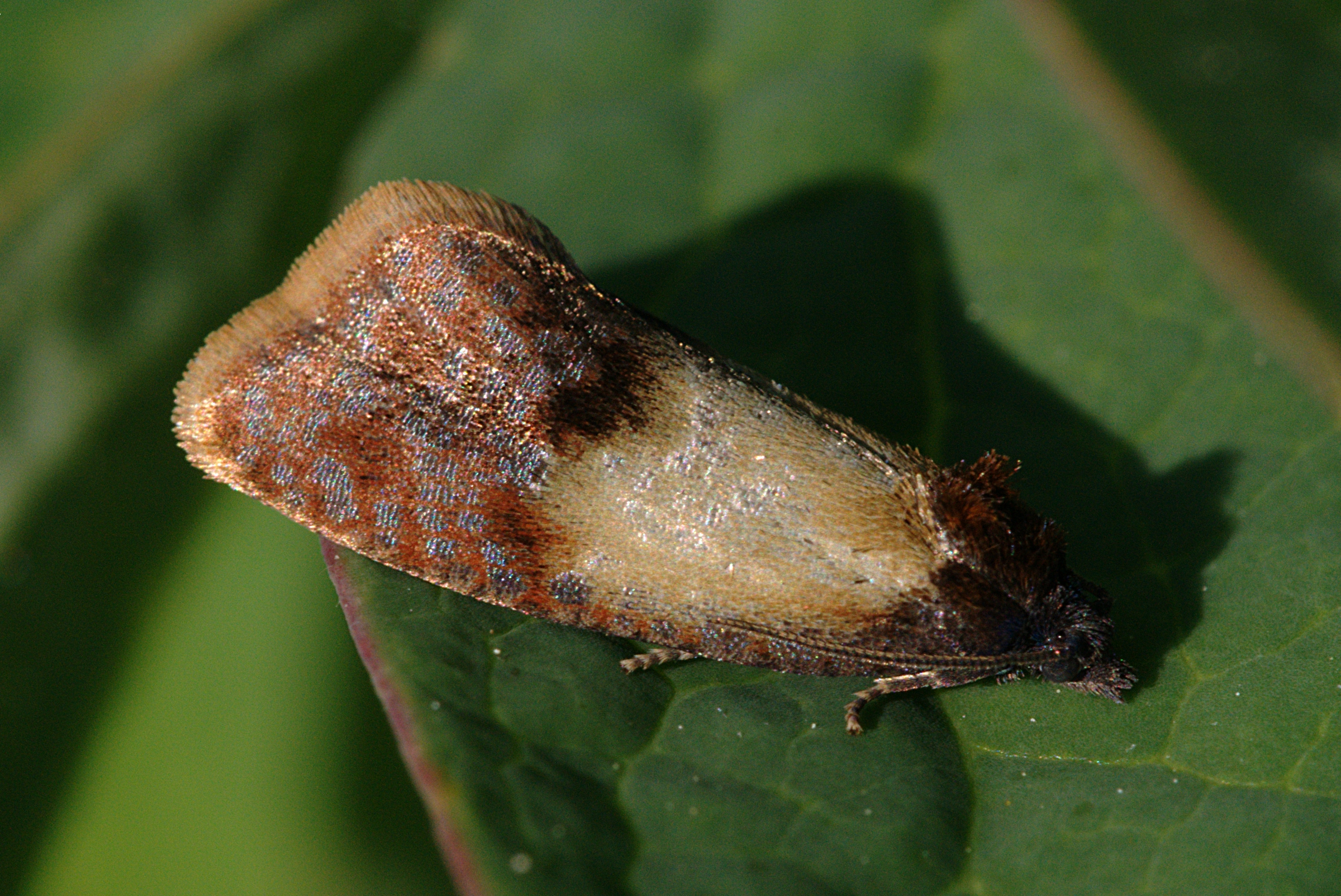

Scientific classification
- Domain: Eukaryota
- Kingdom: Animalia
- Phylum: Arthropoda
- Class: Insecta
- Order: Lepidoptera
- Family: Tortricidae
- Genus: Pelatea
- Species: P. klugiana

Binomial name
- Pelatea klugiana (Freyer, 1836)

Synonyms
- Tortrix klugiana Freyer, 1836

= Pelatea klugiana =

Species of moth

Pelatea klugiana is a moth of the family Tortricidae. It is found from the Iberian Peninsula through southern France (Alpes-Maritimes), Italy, Austria, Slovenia, Hungary, Croatia (Istria), Bulgaria, Romania to Ukraine and southern Russia. In the north it is found up to Lower Austria and Carinthia.

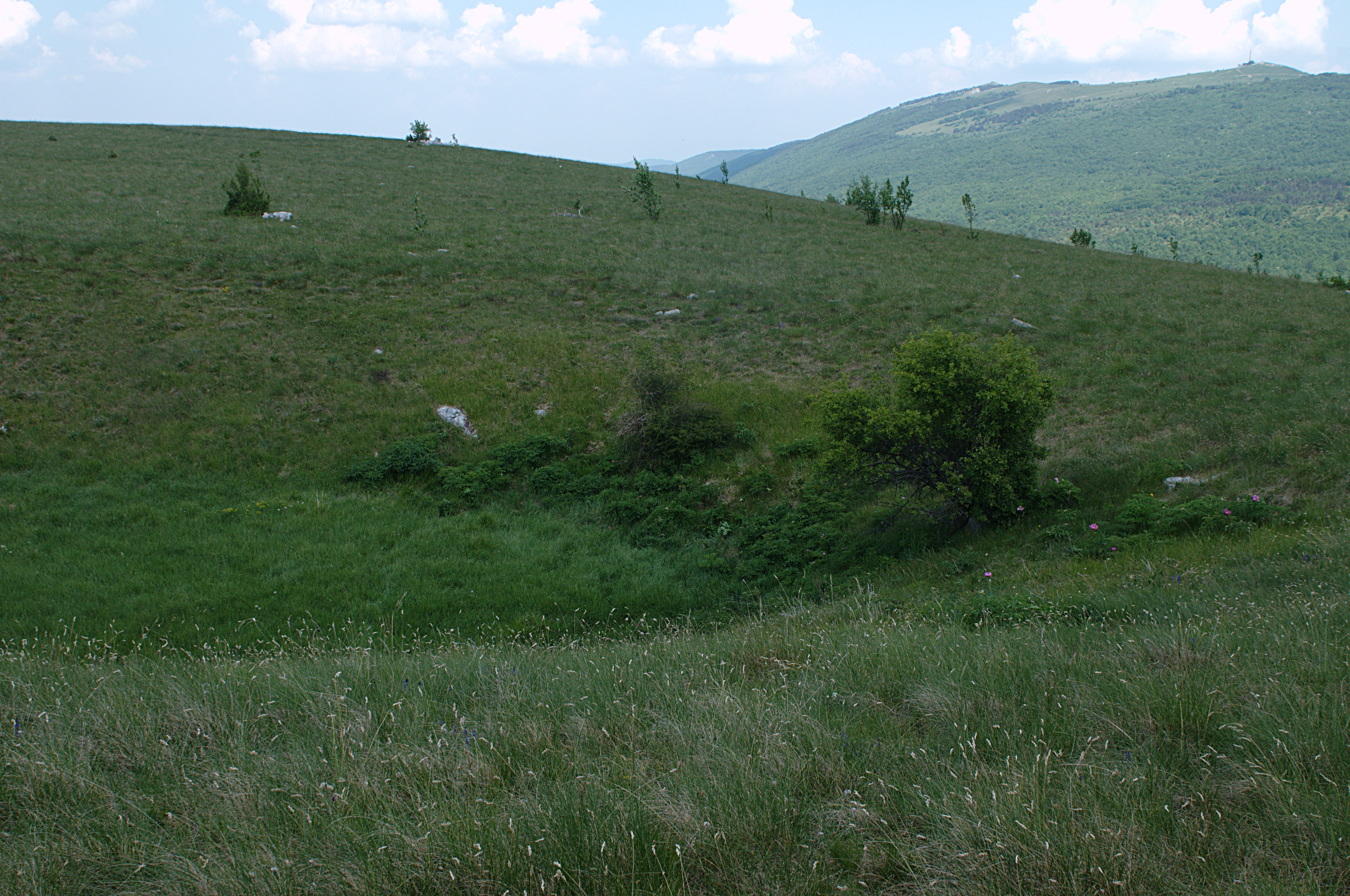
Habitat

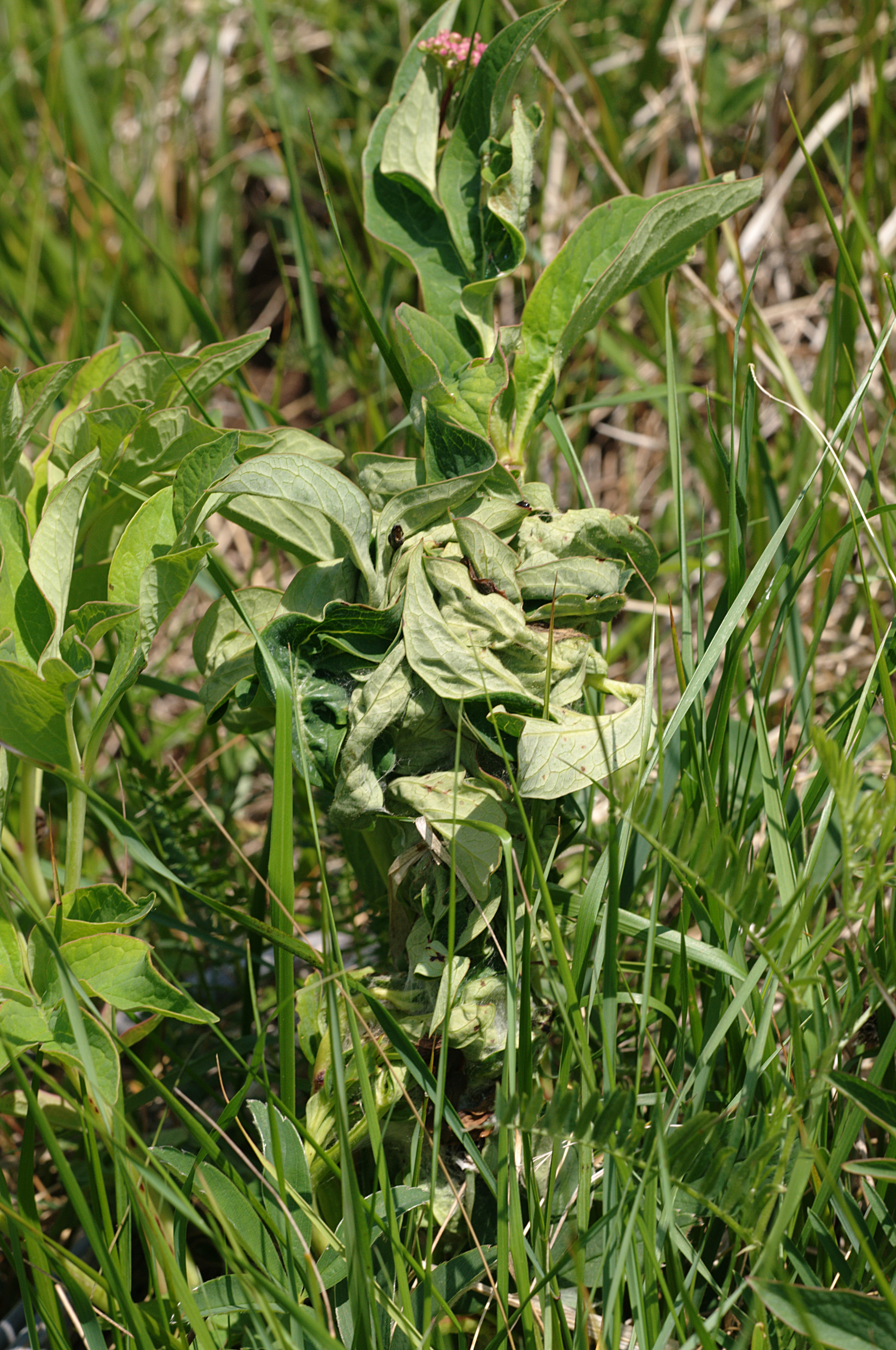
Web

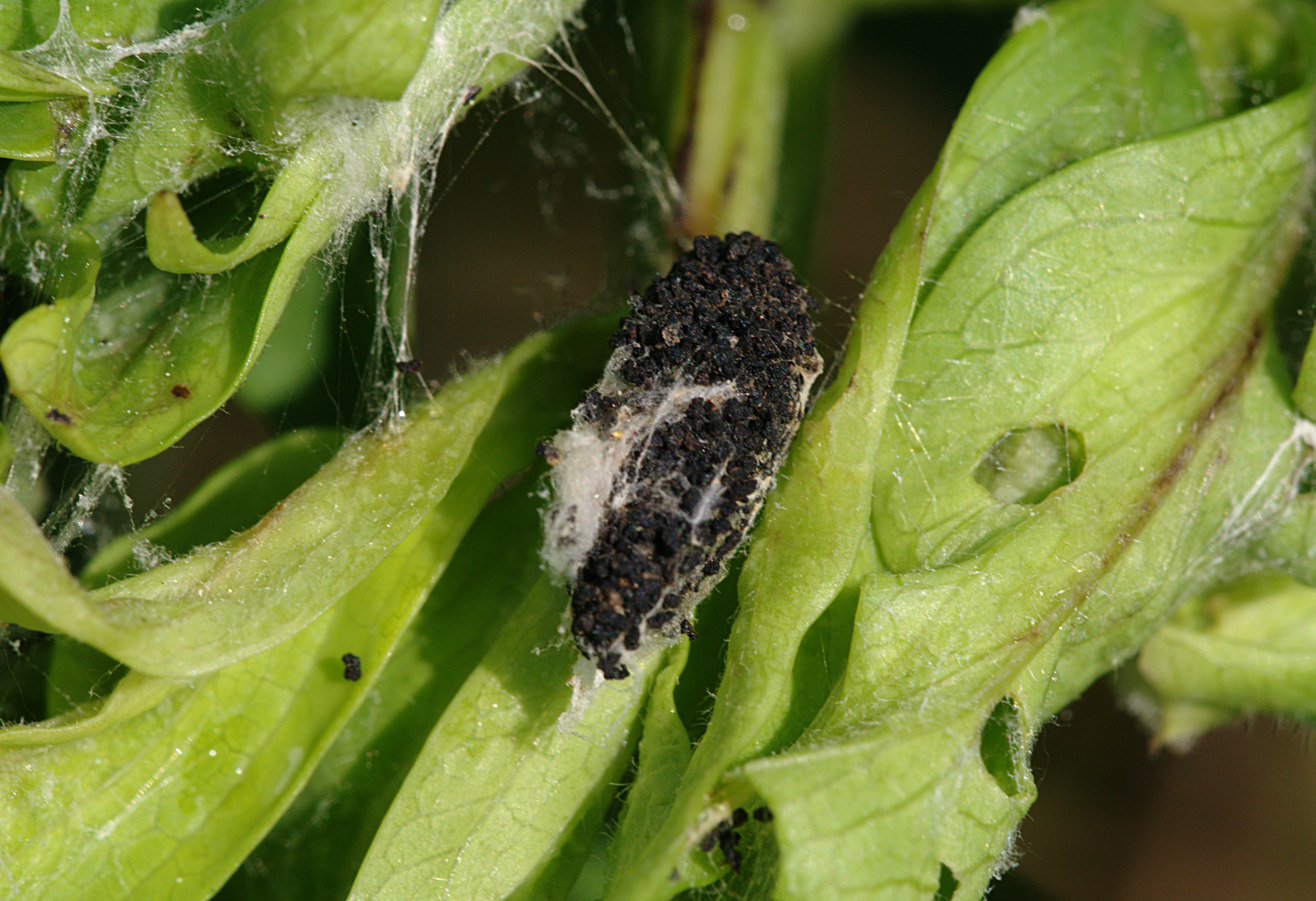
Cocoon in web

The length of the forewings is 10-10.7 mm, although adults of subspecies verucha are somewhat smaller (9.0-9.3 mm). Adults are on wing from May to June in one generation per year.

The larvae feed on Paeonia tenuifolia, Paeonia rosea, Paeonia officinalis and Paeonia biebersteiniana. They live in groups of two to seven under a web from which they feed on their host plant. Pupation takes place in the web.

== Subspecies ==
- Pelatea klugiana klugiana
- Pelatea klugiana verucha Nedoshivina & Zolotuhin, 2005 (southern Russia)
