= Methyl gallate =

Names
- Preferred IUPAC name Methyl 3,4,5-trihydroxybenzoate
- Other names Methylgallate; Gallic acid methyl ester Gallicin

Identifiers
CAS Number	99-24-1
3D model (JSmol)	Interactive image
ChEBI	CHEBI:145828
ChemSpider	7150
ECHA InfoCard	100.002.492
EC Number	202-741-7
PubChem CID	7428
UNII	623D3XG80C
CompTox Dashboard (EPA)	DTXSID3059189
- InChI: InChI=1S/C8H8O5/c1-13-8(12)4-2-5(9)7(11)6(10)3-4/h2-3,9-11H,1H3 Key: FBSFWRHWHYMIOG-UHFFFAOYSA-N; InChI=1/C8H8O5/c1-13-8(12)4-2-5(9)7(11)6(10)3-4/h2-3,9-11H,1H3 Key: FBSFWRHWHYMIOG-UHFFFAOYAZ
- SMILES: COC(=O)C1=CC(=C(C(=C1)O)O)O

Properties
Chemical formula	C_{8}H_{8}O_{5}
Molar mass	184.147 g·mol^{−1}
- Except where otherwise noted, data are given for materials in their standard state (at 25 °C [77 °F], 100 kPa). Infobox references

Methyl gallate is a phenolic compound. It is the methyl ester of gallic acid.

== Natural occurrences ==
It is found in Terminalia myriocarpa, Bergenia ciliata (hairy Bergenia) and Geranium niveum.

It is found in the fruit extract of Paeonia anomala.

It is also found in wine.

== See also ==
- Phenolic content in wine
