= Pelatea assidua =

Scientific classification
- Kingdom: Animalia
- Phylum: Arthropoda
- Class: Insecta
- Order: Lepidoptera
- Family: Tortricidae
- Genus: Pelatea
- Species: P. assidua

Binomial name
- Pelatea assidua (Meyrick, 1914)

Synonyms
- Argyroploce assidua Meyrick, 1914

Species of moth

Pelatea assidua is a moth of the family Tortricidae. It is found in Taiwan.
