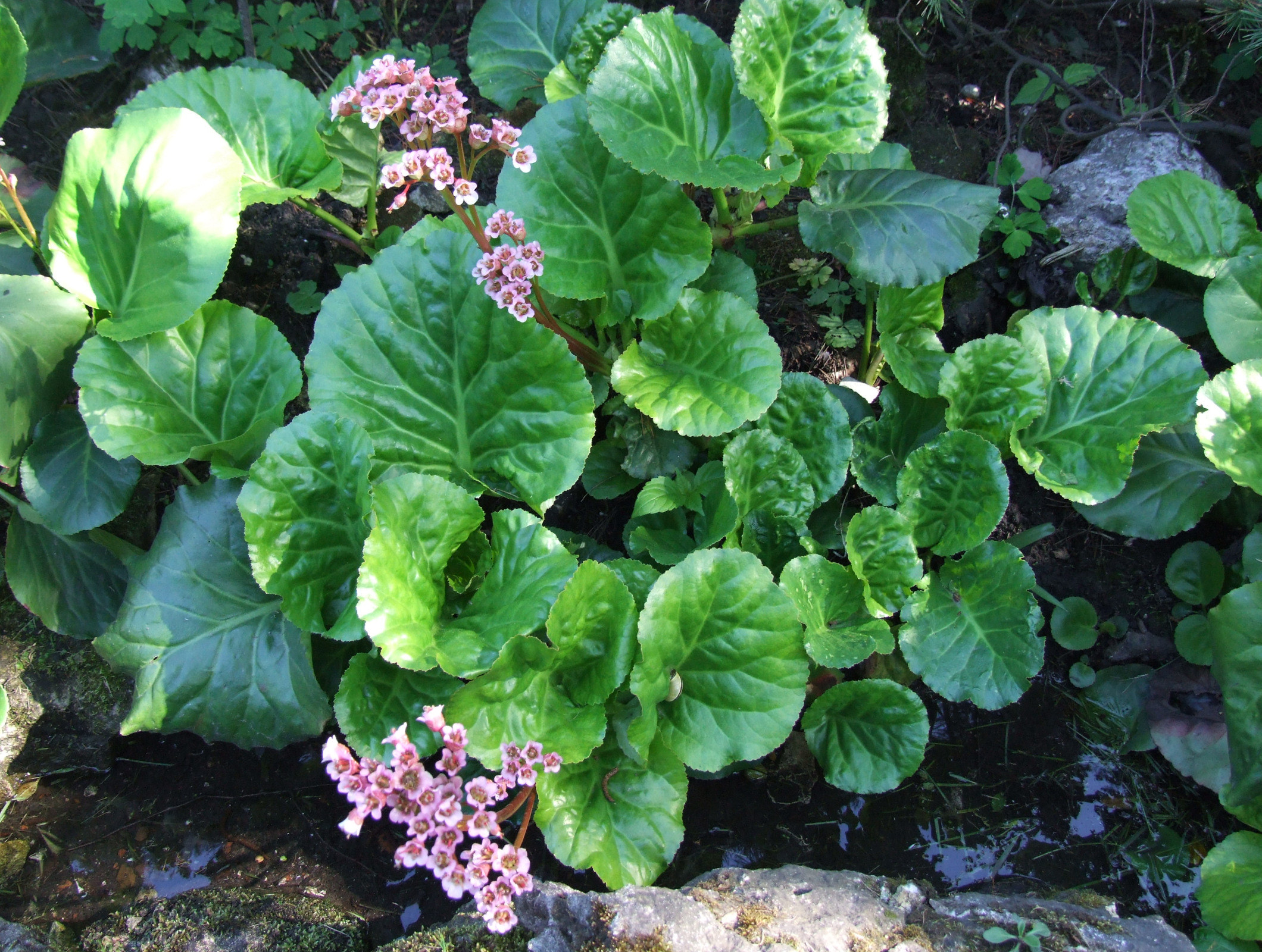
- Bergenia crassifolia, like many of its congeners, was originally believed to be a saxifrage

Scientific classification
- Kingdom: Plantae
- Clade: Tracheophytes
- Clade: Angiosperms
- Clade: Eudicots
- Order: Saxifragales
- Family: Saxifragaceae
- Genus: Bergenia
- Species: B. crassifolia

Binomial name
- Bergenia crassifolia (L.) Fritsch

Varieties
- Bergenia crassifolia var. crassifolia Bergenia crassifolia var. pacifica

Synonyms
- Bergenia cordifolia (Haw.) Sternb. Saxifraga cordifolia Haw. Saxifraga crassifola L.

= Bergenia crassifolia =

Species of flowering plant

Bergenia crassifolia is a species of flowering plant of the genus Bergenia in the family Saxifragaceae. Common names for the species include heart-leaved bergenia, heartleaf bergenia, leather bergenia, winter-blooming bergenia, elephant-ears, elephant's ears, Korean elephant-ear, badan, pigsqueak, Siberian tea, and Mongolian tea.

The species epithet crassifolia means "thick-leaved", while the epithet in the synonym Bergenia cordifolia means "cordate (heart-shaped) leaf" (although the leaves may also be described as spoon-shaped). The cultivar 'Rosa Zeiten' has gained the Royal Horticultural Society's Award of Garden Merit.

== Description ==
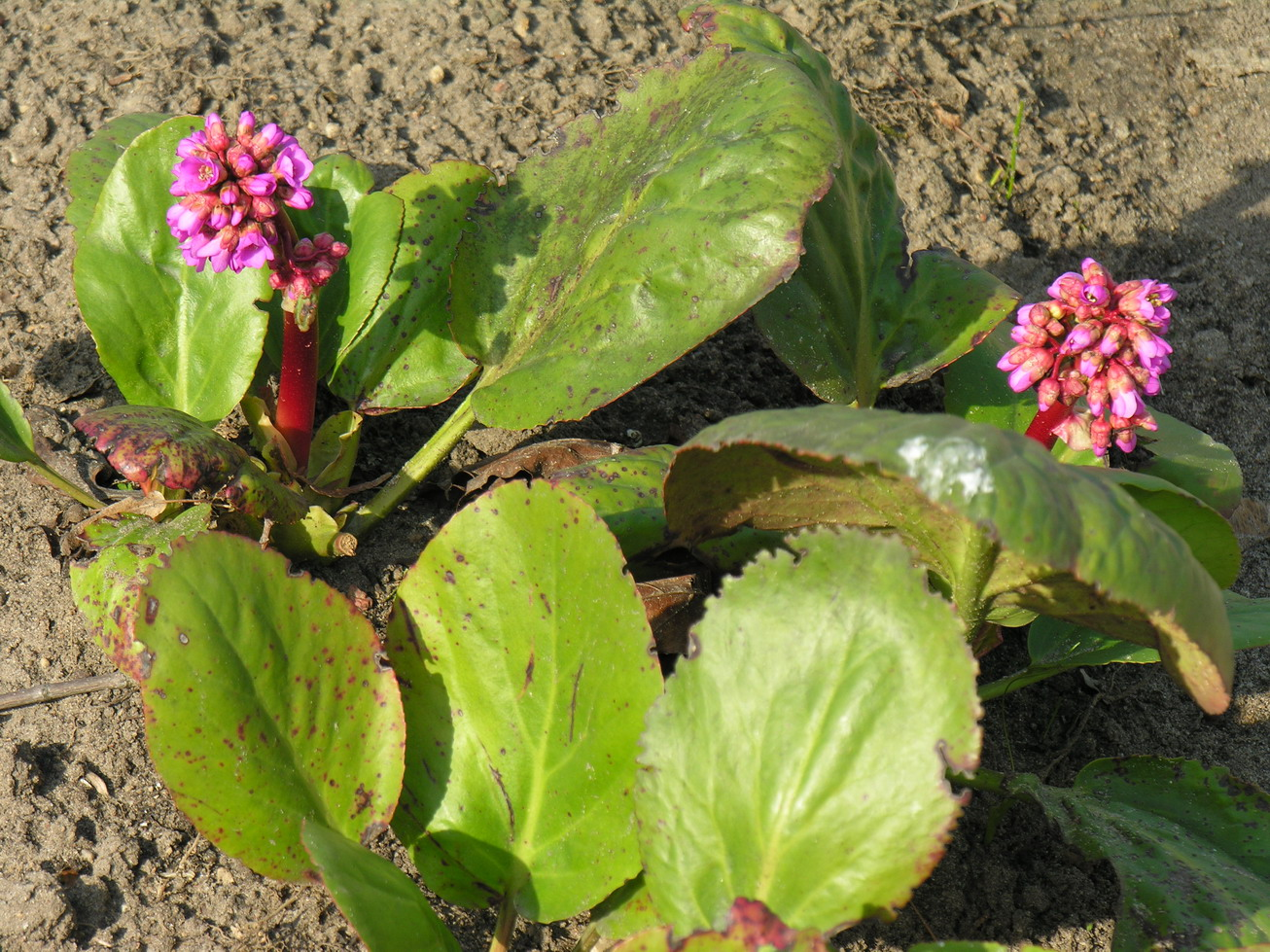
Growing in clumps

It grows to about 12 inches (30 cm) tall. The leaves are winter hardy in warmer climates and change colour in the range of rust brown to brown-red. The rhizome is creeping, fleshy, thick, reaching several meters in length and 3.5 cm in diameter, with numerous root lobes, highly branched, located near the soil surface, turning into a powerful vertical root. The stem is thick, leafless, glabrous, pink-red, 15-50 cm high.

Leaves are in a basal dense rosette (wintering under the snow), dark green, which redden by autumn, with an almost rounded blade and a membranous sheath remaining up to two to three years. The leaf blade is broadly elliptical or almost rounded, rounded or chordate at the base, obtuse or indistinctly dentate, 3–35 cm long, 2.5–30 cm wide, on wide petioles not exceeding the length of the plate, equipped at the base with membranous vaginal stipules.

=== Flowers and fruits ===
Flowers are small, regular, lacking bracts, in apical thick paniculately-corymbiform inflorescence, usually two for long reddish leafless peduncle length of 4 cm. Calyx is naked half dissected into five oval top rounded lobes of up to 4 mm; petals obovate or broadly ovate, with a wide short marigold, 10-12 mm long, 6-8 mm wide, with a blunt-rounded apex and many veins, purple-red or pink. The stamens are twice as long as the calyx, and there are ten of them. Pistil has a semi-lower ovary, deeply divided into two (three) columns with wide stigmas.

The fruit is an ellipsoidal, dry capsule with two diverging lobes opening along the abdominal suture. Seeds are numerous, oblong, smooth, glabrous, faceted, almost black, up to 2 mm long.

The plant blooms in late spring and early summer before the appearance of young leaves. The seeds ripen in mid or late summer.

== Cultivation ==
It is a widely-grown garden plant; cultivars include Bergenia cordifolia 'Purpurea', Bergenia cordifolia 'Winterglut', Bergenia cordifolia 'Senior', and Bergenia crassifolia 'Autumn Red'. It mainly reproduces vegetatively (by segments of rhizomes), but reproduction by seeds is not excluded. As an ornamental plant, it has been known in culture since the middle of the 18th century, it is used for landscaping, in stone gardens, arrays of shrubs and trees. Gardeners bred several forms with flowers of various colors. The plant prefers semi-shady and shady places with moderately dry, fertile soil. Propagated by dividing the bush in the fall.

== Uses ==
Bergenia crassifolia is used as a tea substitute in its native Siberia, Altay and Mongolia. For medicinal purposes, rhizomes are used, which are collected by hand, cleaned and washed in cold running water. Large rhizomes are cut into long pieces. After preliminary drying, they are dried in the shade or in a well-ventilated area, laid out in a layer of 5 cm on paper or fabric. Leaves are used much less often. It is used in tanning sole and Russian leather, as well as the impregnation of nets and tarpaulins. The raw materials collected high in the mountains contain more tannides than in the low mountains.

The medicinal properties of the plant have long been used in Russian folk medicine, as well as in the medicine of Tibet and China. Aqueous extracts of rhizome and leaves inside are used for colitis and enterocolitis of a non-infectious nature, tuberculosis, acute and chronic pneumonia, pulmonary haemorrhage, influenza and some other infections, laryngitis, headaches, fevers, articular rheumatism and gastrointestinal diseases.

== Chemistry ==
The plant contains the polyphenols arbutin, kaempferol 3-lathyroside, catechin 3-O-gallate, tannins and the pectin bergenan.

== See also ==
- List of the vascular plants of Britain and Ireland (dicotyledons)
