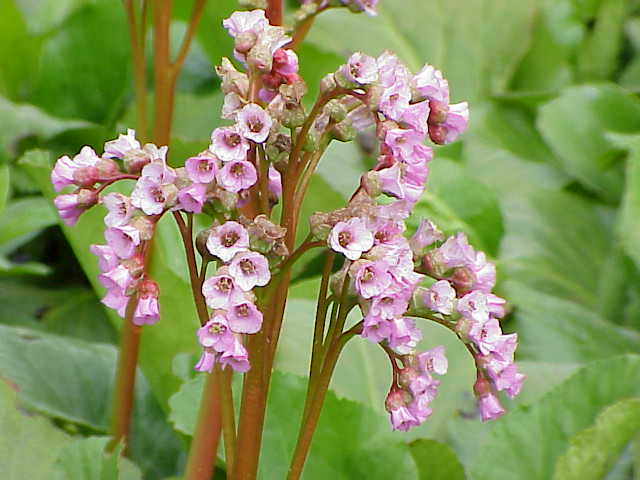

Scientific classification
- Kingdom: Plantae
- Clade: Tracheophytes
- Clade: Angiosperms
- Clade: Eudicots
- Order: Saxifragales
- Family: Saxifragaceae
- Genus: Bergenia
- Species: B. stracheyi

Binomial name
- Bergenia stracheyi (Hook.f. & Thorns.) Engl. in Bot. Zeitung. 26:842. 1868

Synonyms
- Saxifraga stracheyi Hook.f. & Thorns.

= Bergenia stracheyi =

Species of flowering plant

Bergenia stracheyi is a plant species in the genus Bergenia found in the Western Himalayas, from 2700 to 4700 m, Afghanistan and Tajikistan.

Bergenin and norbergenin are chemical compounds that can be isolated from rhizomes of B. stracheyi.

== Cultivars ==
- Bergenia stracheyi 'Alba'
- Bergenia stracheyi 'Afghanica'
