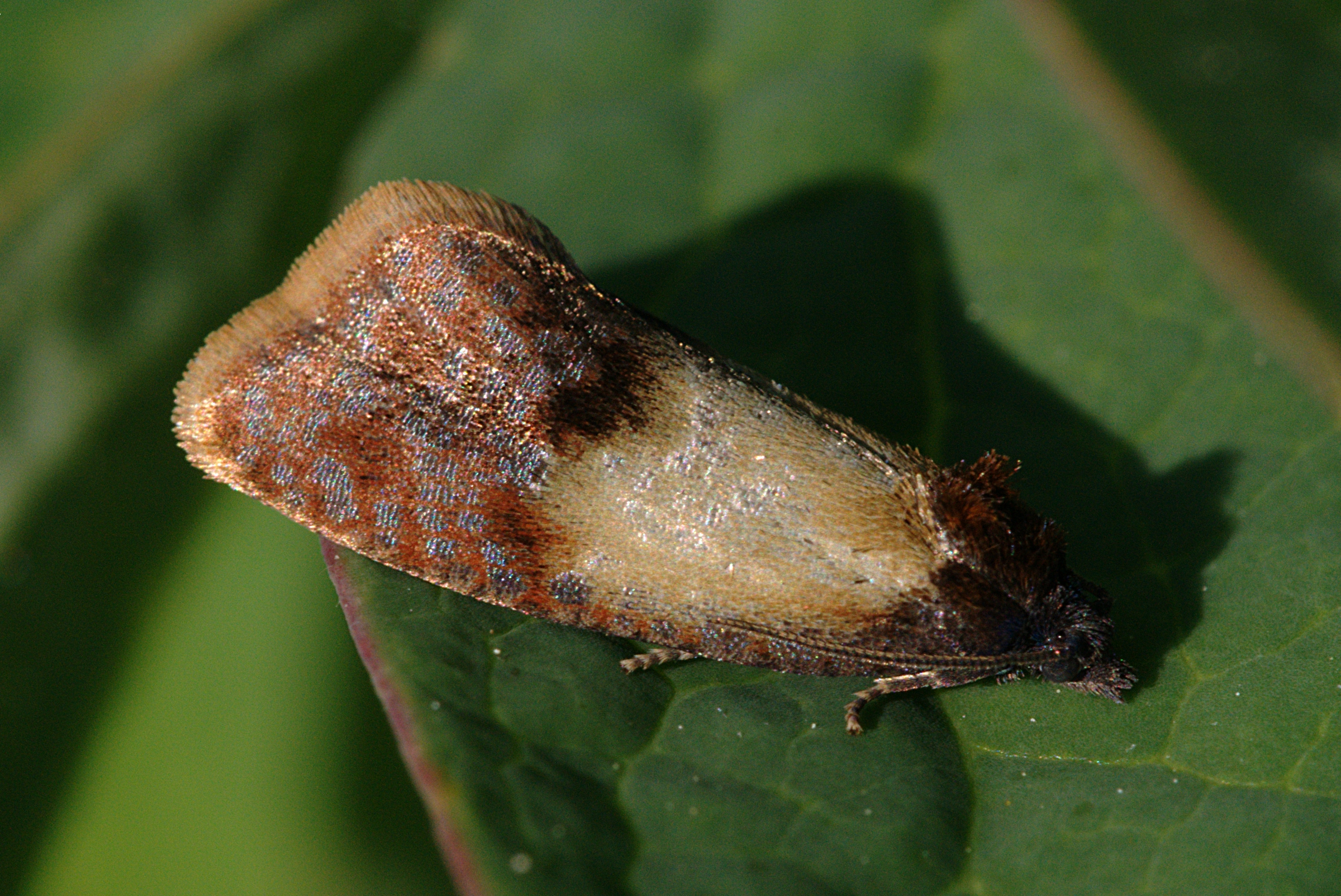
- Pelatea klugiana

Scientific classification
- Domain: Eukaryota
- Kingdom: Animalia
- Phylum: Arthropoda
- Class: Insecta
- Order: Lepidoptera
- Family: Tortricidae
- Tribe: Olethreutini
- Genus: Pelatea; Guenée, 1845

= Pelatea =

Genus of tortrix moths

Pelatea is a genus of moths belonging to the subfamily Olethreutinae of the family Tortricidae.

== Species ==
- Pelatea assidua (Meyrick, 1914)
- Pelatea klugiana (Freyer, 1836)

== See also ==
- List of Tortricidae genera
