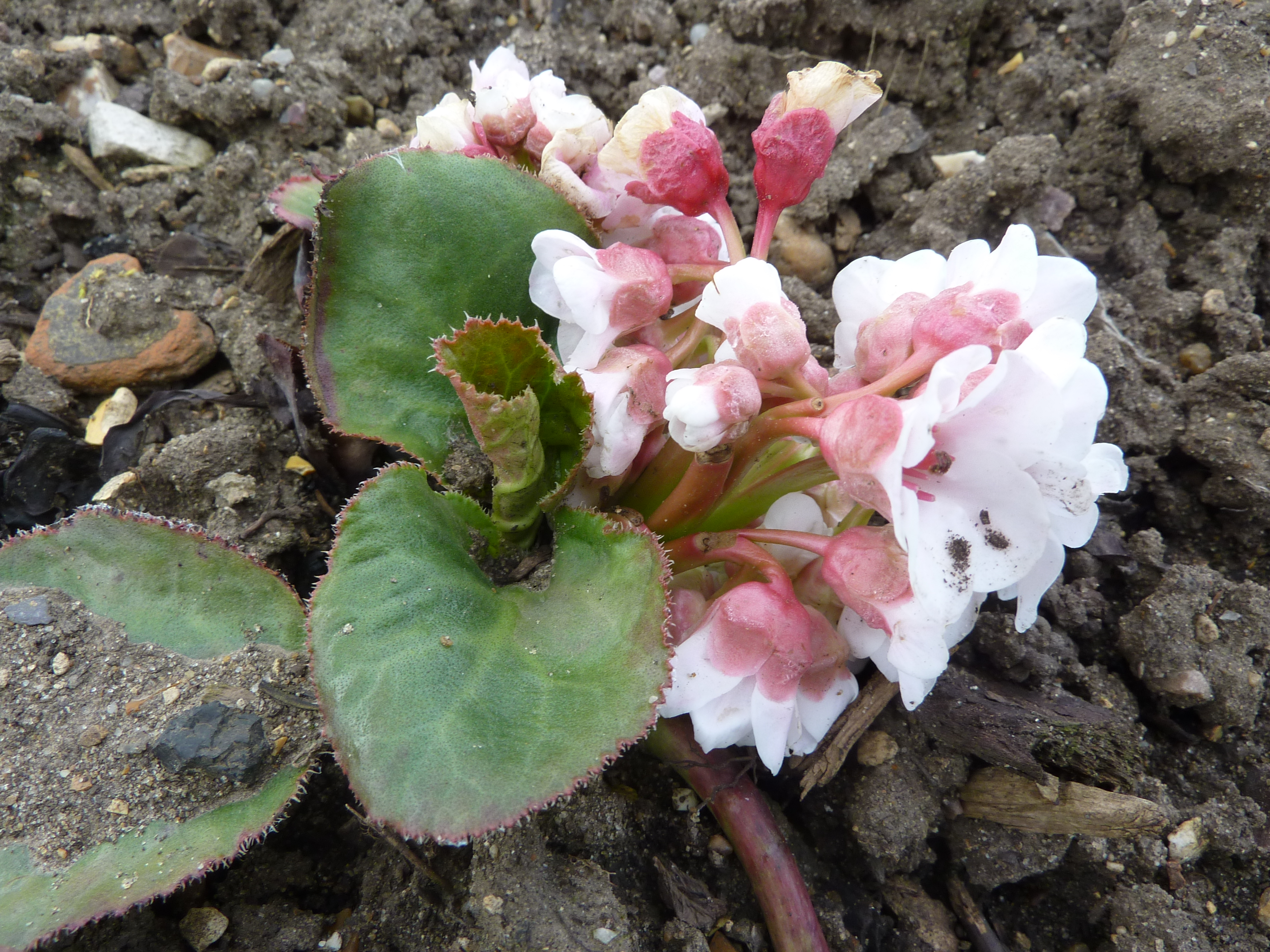

Scientific classification
- Kingdom: Plantae
- Clade: Tracheophytes
- Clade: Angiosperms
- Clade: Eudicots
- Order: Saxifragales
- Family: Saxifragaceae
- Genus: Bergenia
- Species: B. ciliata

Binomial name
- Bergenia ciliata (Haw.) Sternb. Revis. Saxifrag. suppl. 2:2. 1831

= Bergenia ciliata =

Species of flowering plant

Bergenia ciliata (fringed elephant's ears, winter begonia, hairy bergenia, Hindi & Sanskrit : Pashanbheda, पाषाणभेद) is a plant species in the genus Bergenia, deciduous in USDA Zones 5 to 7, but usually remain semi-evergreen south of Zone 7. It is found in Northern India in Uttarakhand (Chamoli and other districts of Uttarakhand) and Himachal Pradesh (in district Shimla). This flower is related to the famous Phool Dei Festival (https://www.tourmyindia.com/states/uttarakhand/phool-dei-festival.html) celebrated in Uttarakhand. It is commonly known in India as Pathar phor buti. Also found in mountain areas of West Bengal, like Kalimpong, and Darjeeling. Afghanistan, south Tibet, Northern Nepal, Bhutan (Haa and Mongar districts).

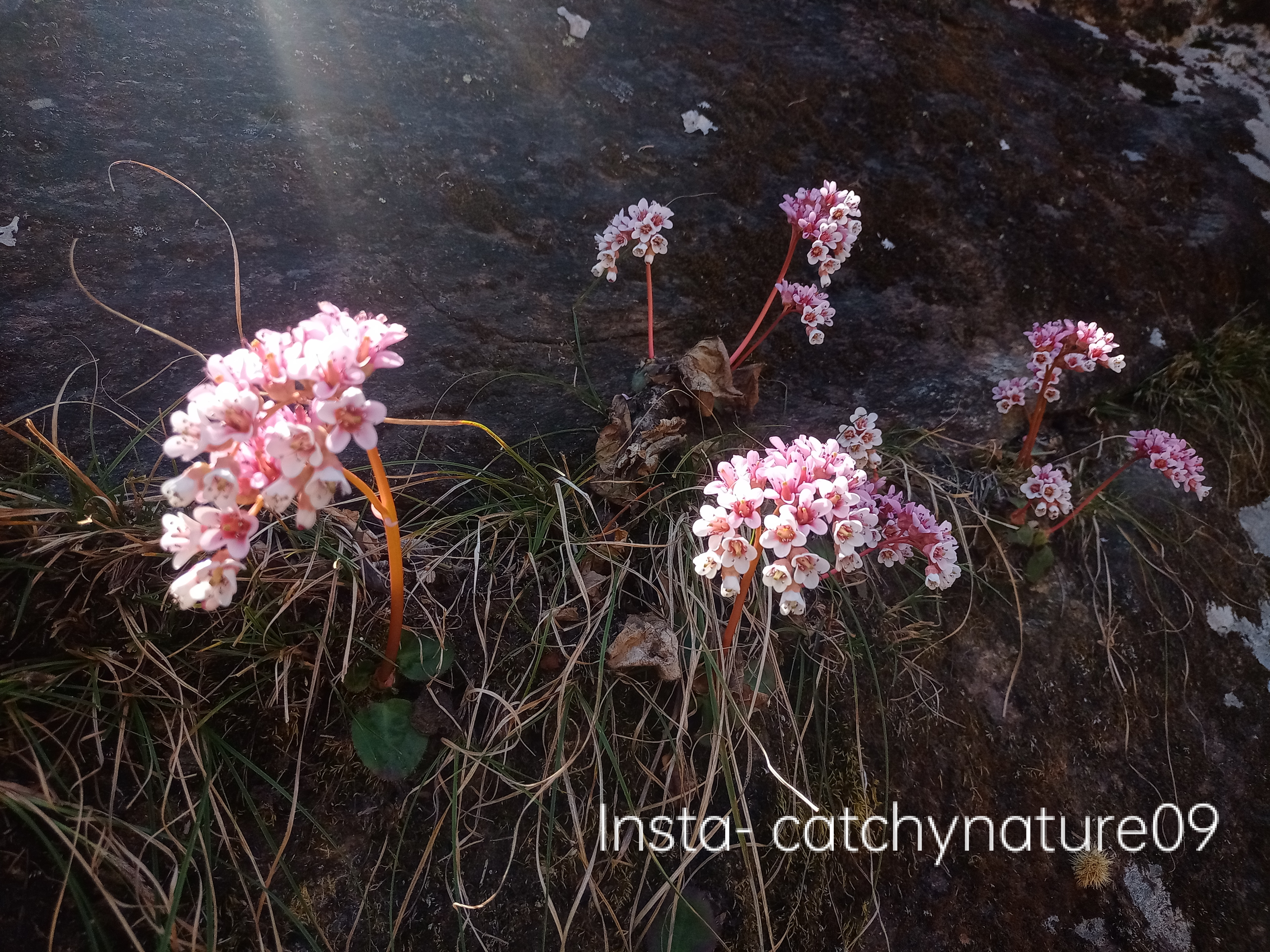
Bergenia Ciliata flower

Bergenin, catechin, gallic acid, gallicin, catechin-7-O-glucoside and β-sitosterol can be found in B. ciliata. It is known for its use in Ayurveda and other medicinal properties. It is mainly found on rocks and it grows in the month of February and March. It is a highly cited medicinal plant in the Himalayan state of Sikkim located in Northeastern India.

The plant is harvested from the wild for use as a medicine and sometimes also for food.

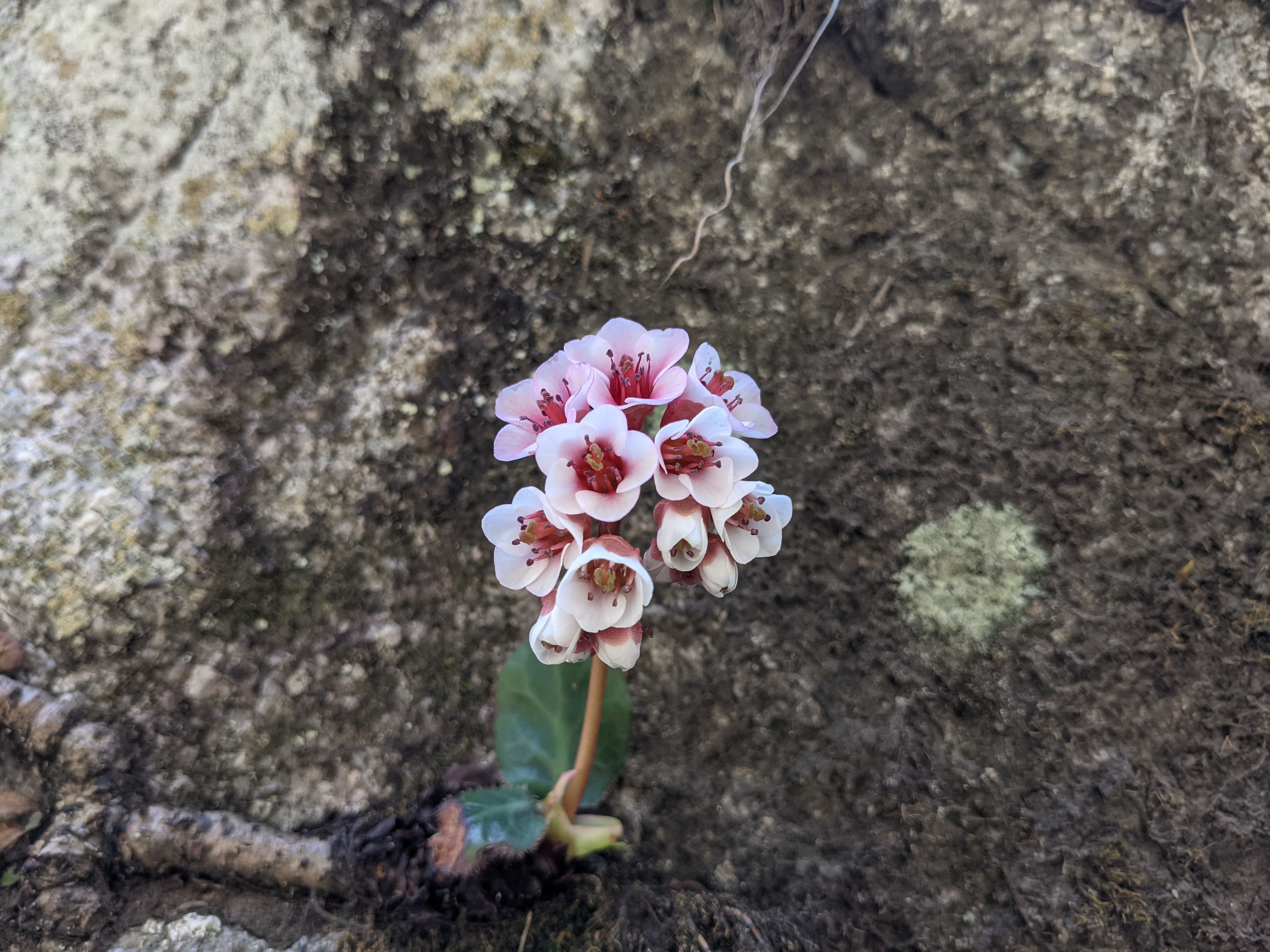
Bergania ciliata growing on the trail to Kareri lake in Himachal Pradesh, India

== Images ==
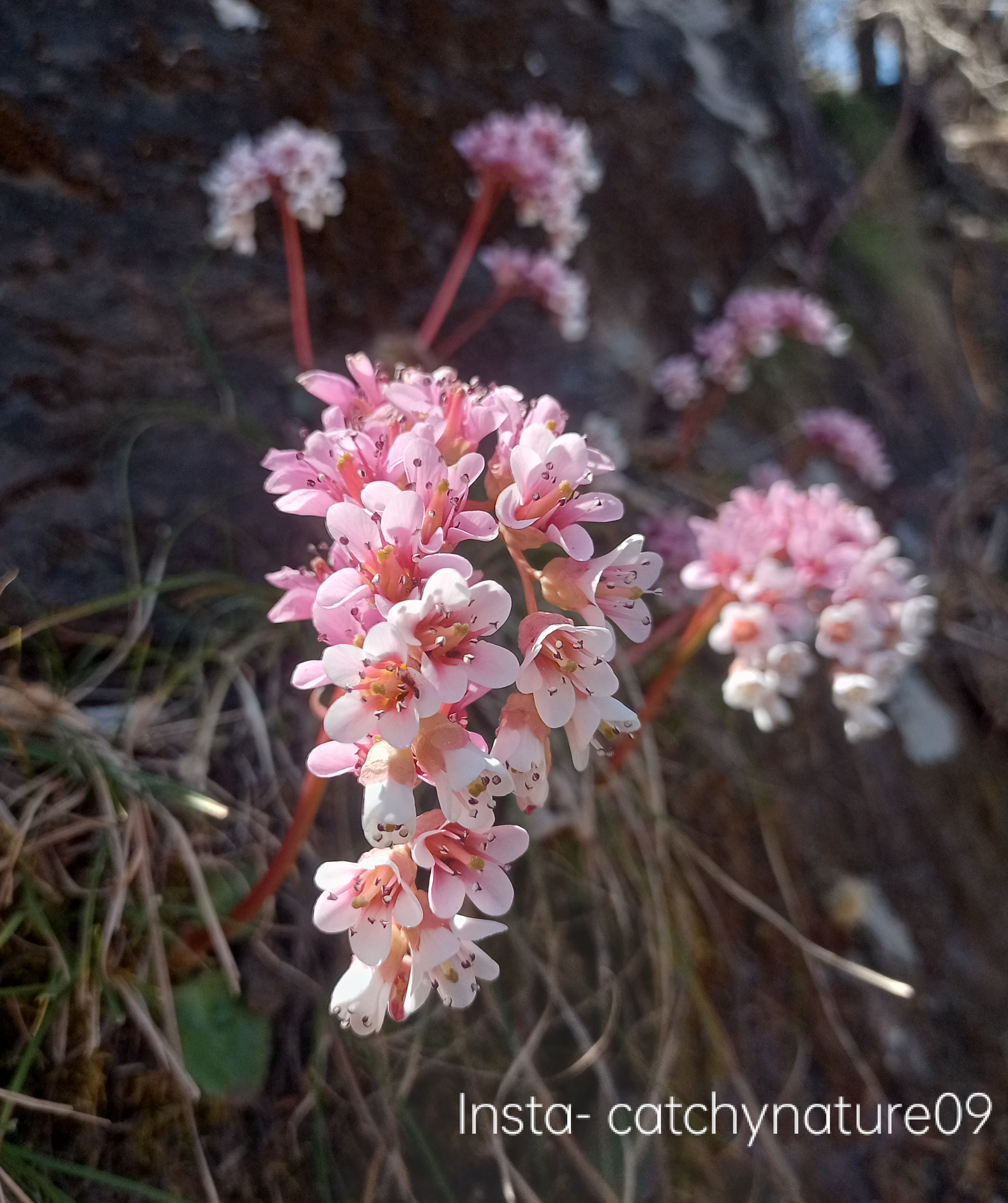
It is widely used in the treatment of dysuria, cystisis, crystalluria and renal failure, vertigo and headache.
