= Norbergenin =

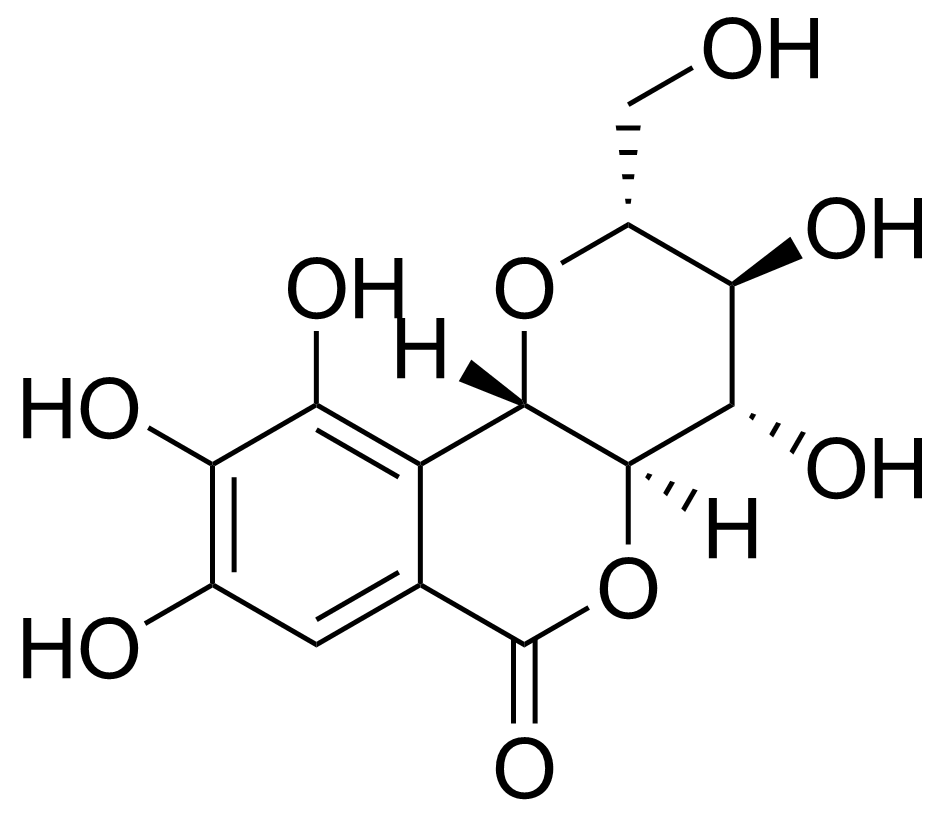
- Chemical structure of norbergenin

Names
- IUPAC name (2R,3S,4S,4aR,10bS)-3,4,8,9,10-Pentahydroxy-2-(hydroxymethyl)-3,4,4a,10b-tetrahydro-2H-pyrano[3,2-c]isochromen-6-one
- Other names Demethylbergenin

Identifiers
CAS Number	79595-97-4
3D model (JSmol)	Interactive image
ChEMBL	ChEMBL463164
ChemSpider	65953
PubChem CID	73192
UNII	BS9UP8B38P
CompTox Dashboard (EPA)	DTXSID30229787
- InChI: InChI=1S/C13H14O9/c14-2-5-8(17)10(19)12-11(21-5)6-3(13(20)22-12)1-4(15)7(16)9(6)18/h1,5,8,10-12,14-19H,2H2/t5-,8-,10+,11+,12-/m0/s1 Key: GDYGAIKPBLFCKR-YWQRSDGBSA-N
- SMILES: Oc1cc3c([C@H]2[C@H](OC3=O)[C@@H](O)[C@H](O)[C@@H](CO)O2)c(O)c1O

Properties
Chemical formula	C_{13}H_{14}O_{9}
Molar mass	314.246 g·mol^{−1}
- Except where otherwise noted, data are given for materials in their standard state (at 25 °C [77 °F], 100 kPa). verify (what is ?) Infobox references

Norbergenin is a chemical compound. It is the O-demethylated derivative of bergenin. It can be isolated from rhizomes of Bergenia stracheyi.
