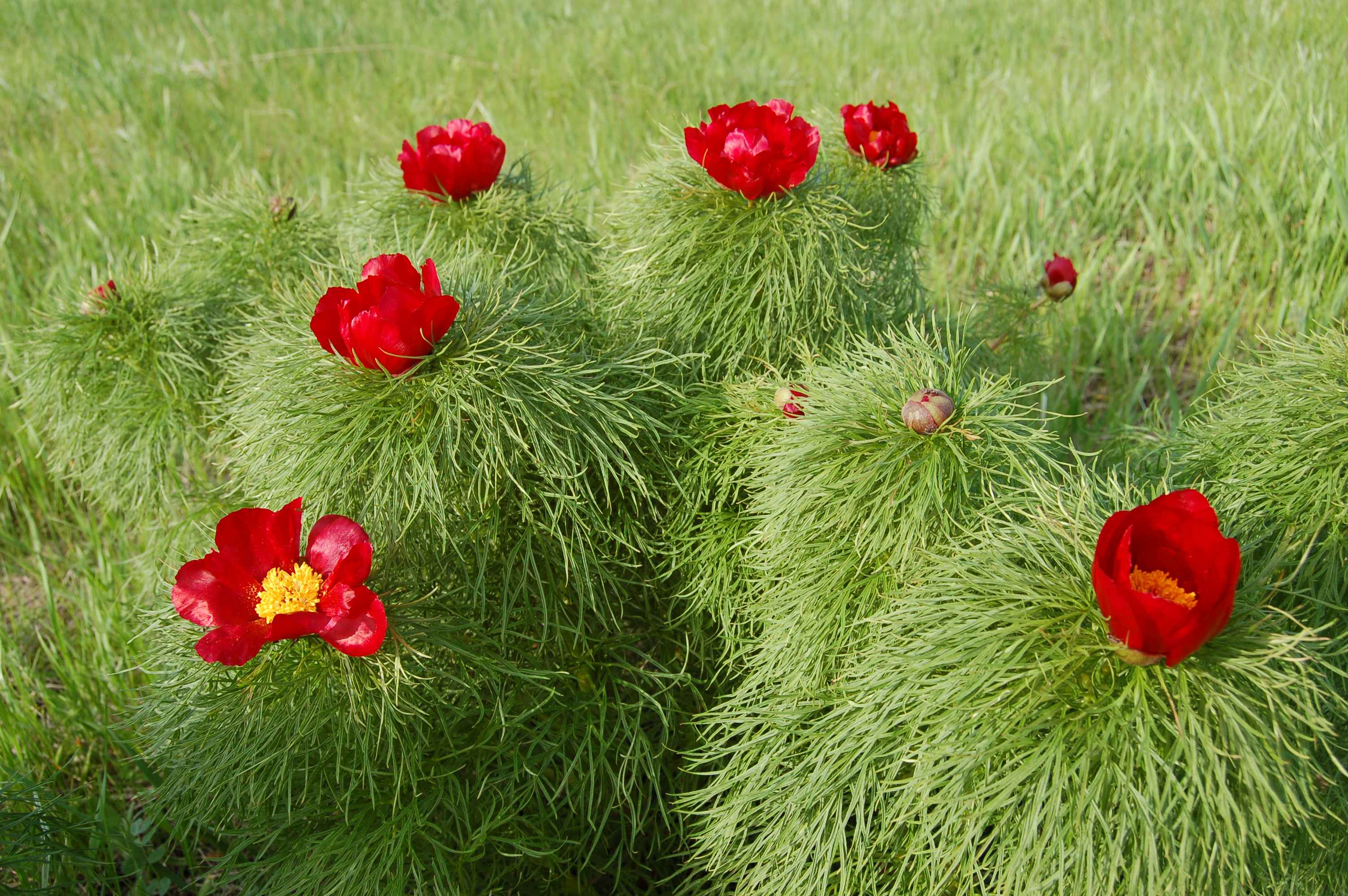

Scientific classification
- Kingdom: Plantae
- Clade: Tracheophytes
- Clade: Angiosperms
- Clade: Eudicots
- Order: Saxifragales
- Family: Paeoniaceae
- Genus: Paeonia
- Species: P. tenuifolia

Binomial name
- Paeonia tenuifolia L.

Synonyms
- P. biebersteiniana, P. tenuifolia ssp. biebersteiniana, var. biebersteiniana; P. carthalinica

= Paeonia tenuifolia =

Species of plant

Paeonia tenuifolia is a herbaceous species of peony that is called the steppe peony or the fern leaf peony. It is native to the Caucasus Mountains, with large fields found in Vashlivani National Park in Georgia and the Black Sea coast of Ukraine, spreading westward into Bulgaria, Romania and Serbia and eastward to northwestern Kazakhstan. It was described by Linnaeus in 1759. The leaves are finely divided into almost thread-like segments and grow close together on the stems. This peony can reach 30–60 cm (12–24 in) in height. The scented red flowers have numerous yellow stamens in the centre.

== Description ==
Paeonia tenuifolia is a hairless herbaceous perennial plant with a stem of 30–60 cm high, which is densely set with alternately arranged compound leaves. The lowest leaves are twice compounded or the leaflets are deeply divided into many fine linear segments, ½-6 mm wide, with a blunt to rounded tip, dark green above, and lighter glaucous green below. The usually single flower on each stem seems to be floating on the foliage. The flower is 6–8 cm across, cup-shaped, with deep crimson, long inverted egg-shaped petals, with a rounded or blunt top. The stamens are 1½—2 cm long, with yellow filaments, anthers and pollen. There are usually three, sometimes two, coarse felty haired carpels, that will eventually develop into 2 cm long, dry, dehiscent fruits called follicles. This species is diploid with ten chromosomes (2n=10).

== Taxonomy ==
Paeonia tenuifolia was first described by Linnaeus in the 10th edition of his Systema naturae of 1759. Franz Josef Ruprecht distinguished it from P. biebersteiniana, which was based on a specimen from Stavropol, in the Flora Caucasi, that was published in 1869. Opinions seem to have been divided as Lomakin only mentions P. tenuifolia in 1897, while two years later Lipsky separated the two species again, along with Nikolai Schipczinsky in 1937. Ketzchoweli described in 1959 P. carthalinica from Igoeti, Georgia and thought it to be very closely related to P. tenuifolia, though having broader leaflets and greyish felty hairs on the carpels and follicles. Kemularia-Nathadze, who revised the genus Paeonia in 1961, considered these two might be synonymous. In 2003, Hong and Zhou found the characters that were used to distinguish between all three taxa occurred in any combination and intergraded. Even within one population, plants typical fitting to either of the original descriptions occurred together. They found one plant with some leaves with very narrow leaflets less than 1 mm, while other leaves on the same plant had broad leaflets of over ½ cm. There seems to be consensus now that all are best considered as one polymorphic species.

== Ecology ==
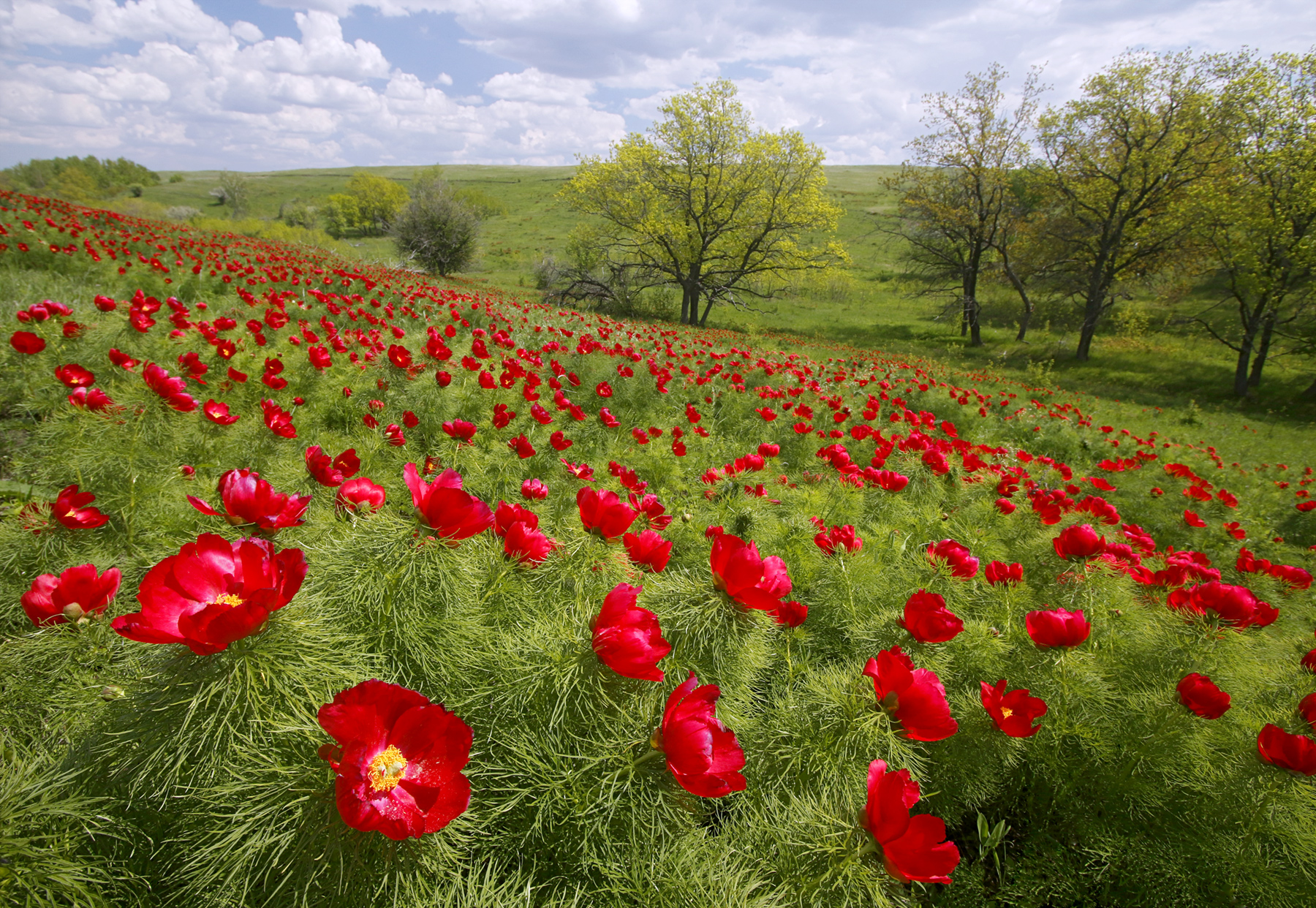
Wild Paeonia tenuifolia in a protected area of Russian steppe, Volgograd Oblast.

P. tenuifolia flowers earlier than other peonies, and dies down early too. This is probably because it grows in steppes, with dry and hot summers. The seeds of this species germinate above the soil in full light, which is exceptional among peonies.

The caterpillars of the moth Pelatea klugiana feed on the leaves of several Paeonia species, including Paeonia tenuifolia. Several larvae live together in a nest of silk that binds together several lobes of a leaf, and move only within the nest.

== Cultivation ==
This hardy species is an attractive plant for the garden which is easy to grow and hardy in temperate zones. Still, as an inhabitant of the steppes of southern Russia and Kazakhstan, it is adapted to growing in the full sun and experiencing cold winters, and dry, hot summers, and it is susceptible to moult development on its leaves during prolonged wet spells. It has been in cultivation in Germany since 1594, and was introduced to England in 1765 and America in 1806. There are several cultivars and hybrids known to be in cultivation:

- Paeonia tenuifolia 'Rosea' has pink flowers
- Paeonia tenuifolia Rosea Plena' with double pink flowers
- Paeonia ×smouthii, a presumed hybrid with P. lactiflora, which was commercially introduced in 1843, and sometimes listed as P. laciniata in nursery catalogues. It is taller than P. tenuifolia, and usually has more than one flower per stem with a sweet perfume, traits inherited from P. lactiflora. It is a diploid, and does not produce fertile seed. It was probably named in honor of M. Smout, a professional chemist at the Catholic University of Mechelen, who was an active breeder of plants.
- Paeonia ×majko, a presumed hybrid with P. daurica, found in Georgia, is not deemed particularly appealing.
- P. tenuifolia var. plena, a variety with double flowers, is said to have been introduced to English gardens in 1765.

P. hybrida: in 1818 it was regarded as a garden hybrid between P. anomala and P. tenuifolia by Augustin Pyramus de Candolle in 1818, which according to him also occurred in the wild. However, Hong and Pan regard P. hybrida as synonymous with P. anomala.
