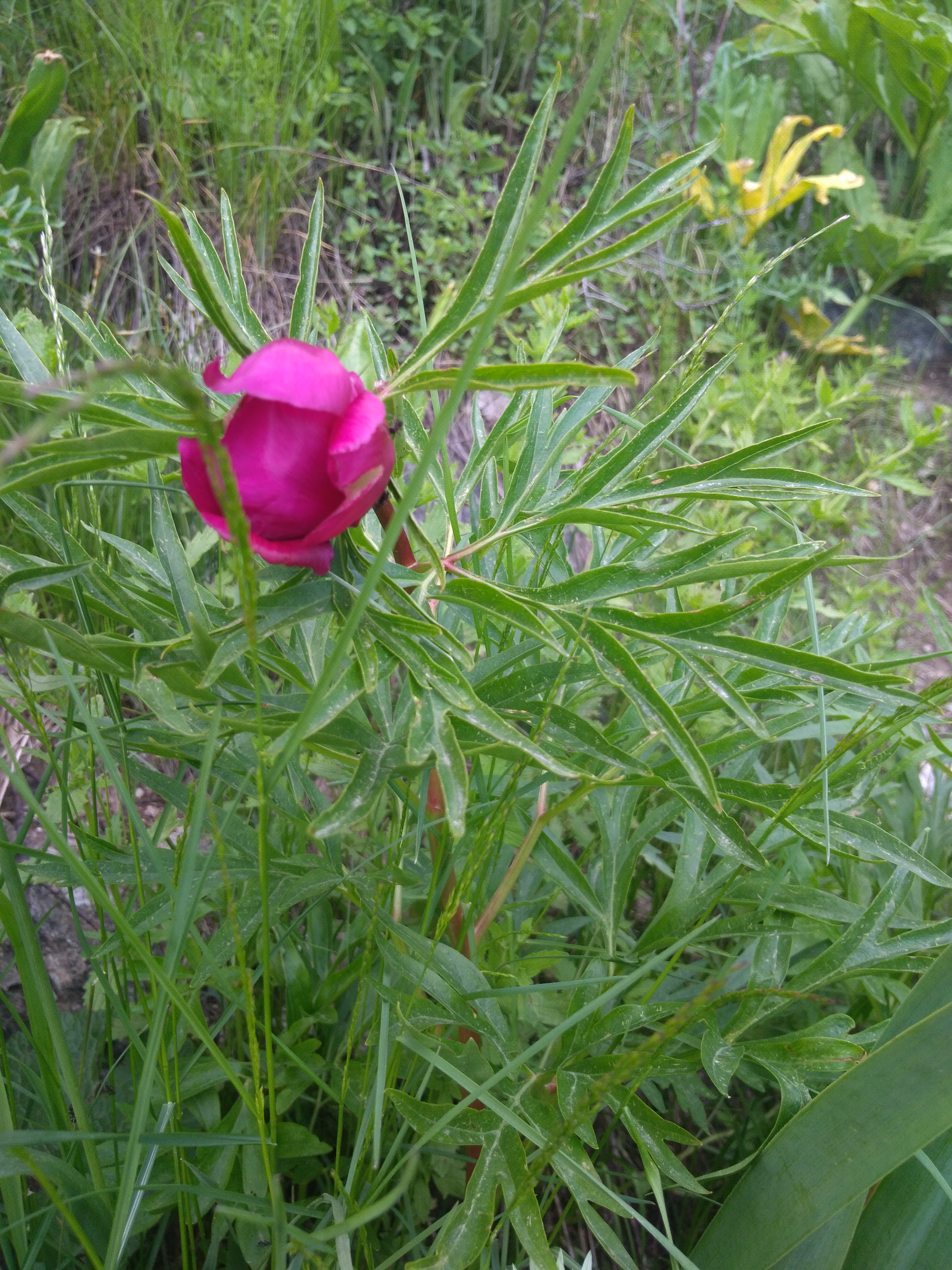
- Flower bud and leaves
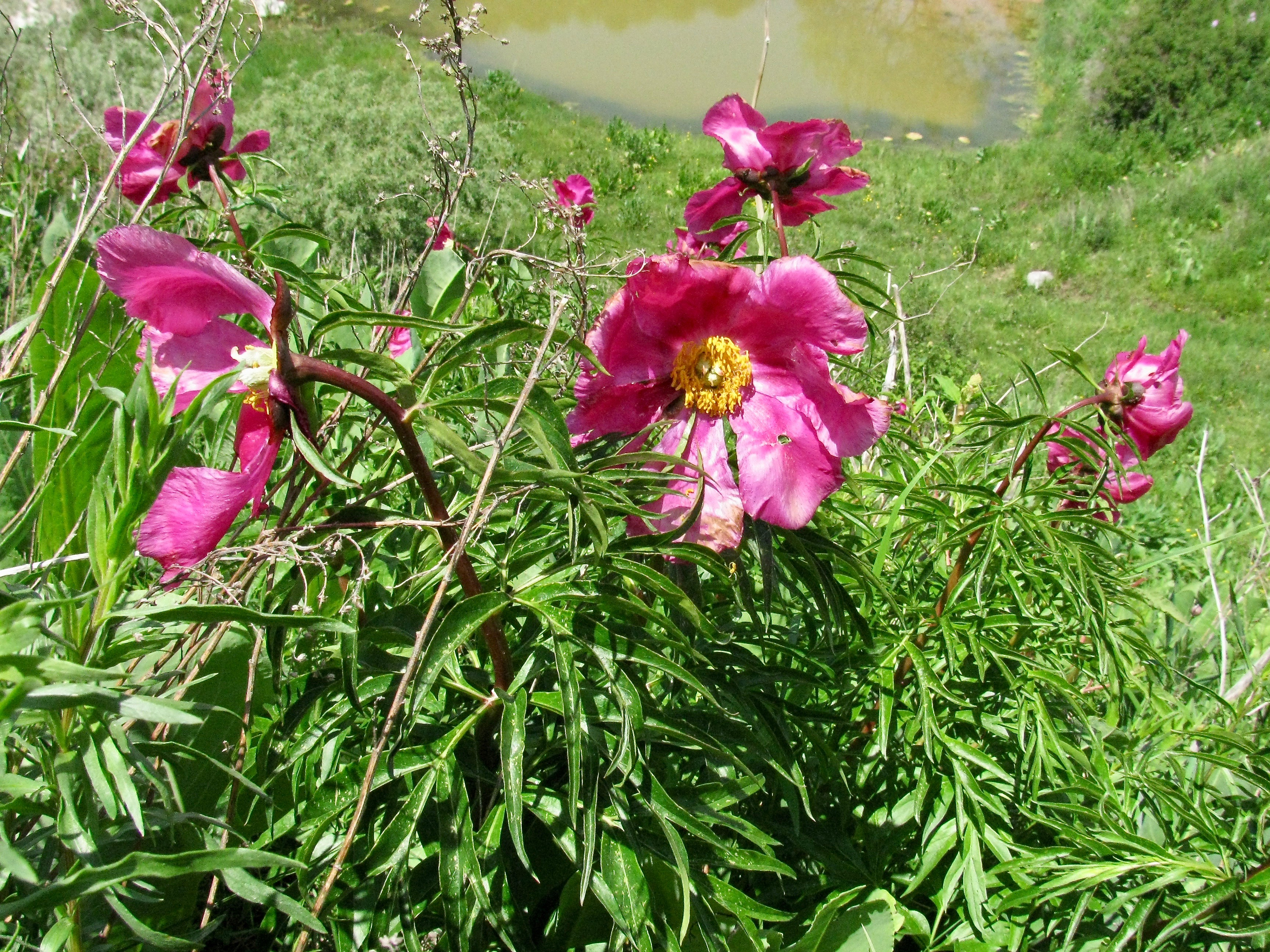
- Open flowers

Scientific classification
- Kingdom: Plantae
- Clade: Tracheophytes
- Clade: Angiosperms
- Clade: Eudicots
- Order: Saxifragales
- Family: Paeoniaceae
- Genus: Paeonia
- Species: P. intermedia

Binomial name
- Paeonia intermedia C.A.Mey.

Synonyms
- List: Paeonia anomala var. hybrida Trautv.; Paeonia anomala subsp. hybrida (Trautv.) Halda; Paeonia anomala subsp. intermedia (C.A.Mey.) Trautv.; Paeonia anomala f. intermedia (C.A.Mey.) Trautv.; Paeonia anomala var. intermedia (C.A.Mey.) B.Fedtsch.; Paeonia anomala subsp. pamiroalaica (Ovcz.) R.Cooper; Paeonia hybrida var. intermedia (C.A.Mey.) Krylov; Paeonia intermedia subsp. pamiroalaica Ovcz.

= Paeonia intermedia =

Species of plant

Paeonia intermedia is a species of flowering plant in the peony family Paeoniaceae, native to Central Asia (except Turkmenistan), the Altai Mountains, and Xinjiang in China. A perennial herb reaching 70 cm (28 in), it is found on scrubby and grassy slopes, and in open woodlands, at elevations of 1,100 to 3,000 m (3,600 to 9,800 ft). It is a diploid with karyotypic formula 2n = 2x = 10 = 6m + 2sm + 2st.
