= List of Russula species =

This is a list of Russula species. The genus Russula has a widespread distribution, and contains over 1600 species.

== Species ==
As of October, 2025, the following species are recognised in the genus Russula:

=== A ===
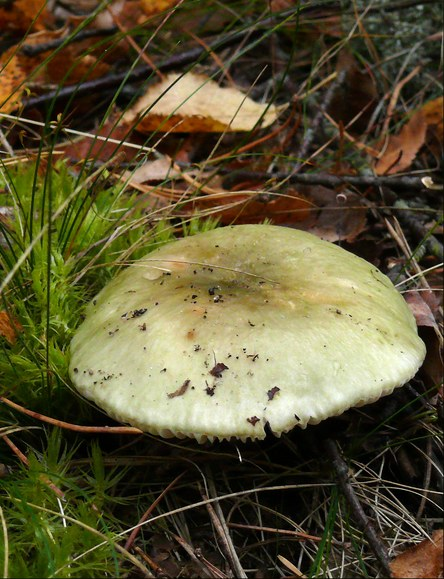
Russula aeruginea Lindblad 1861

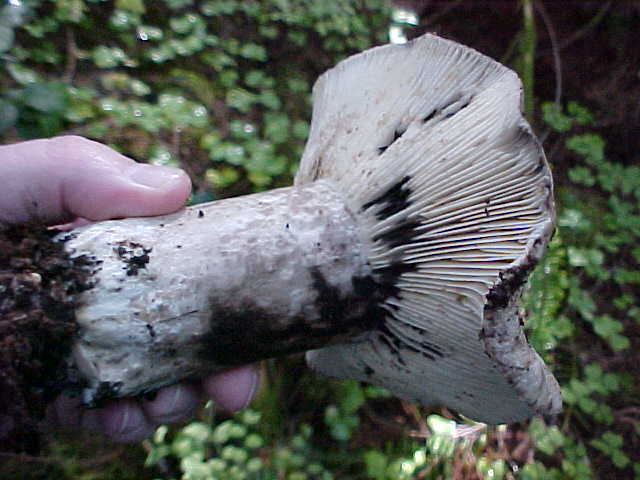
Russula albonigra (Krombh. 1845) Fr. 1874

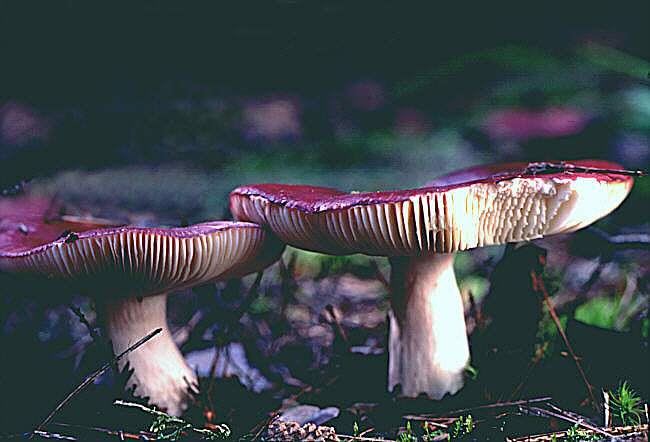
Russula amethystina Quél. 1897

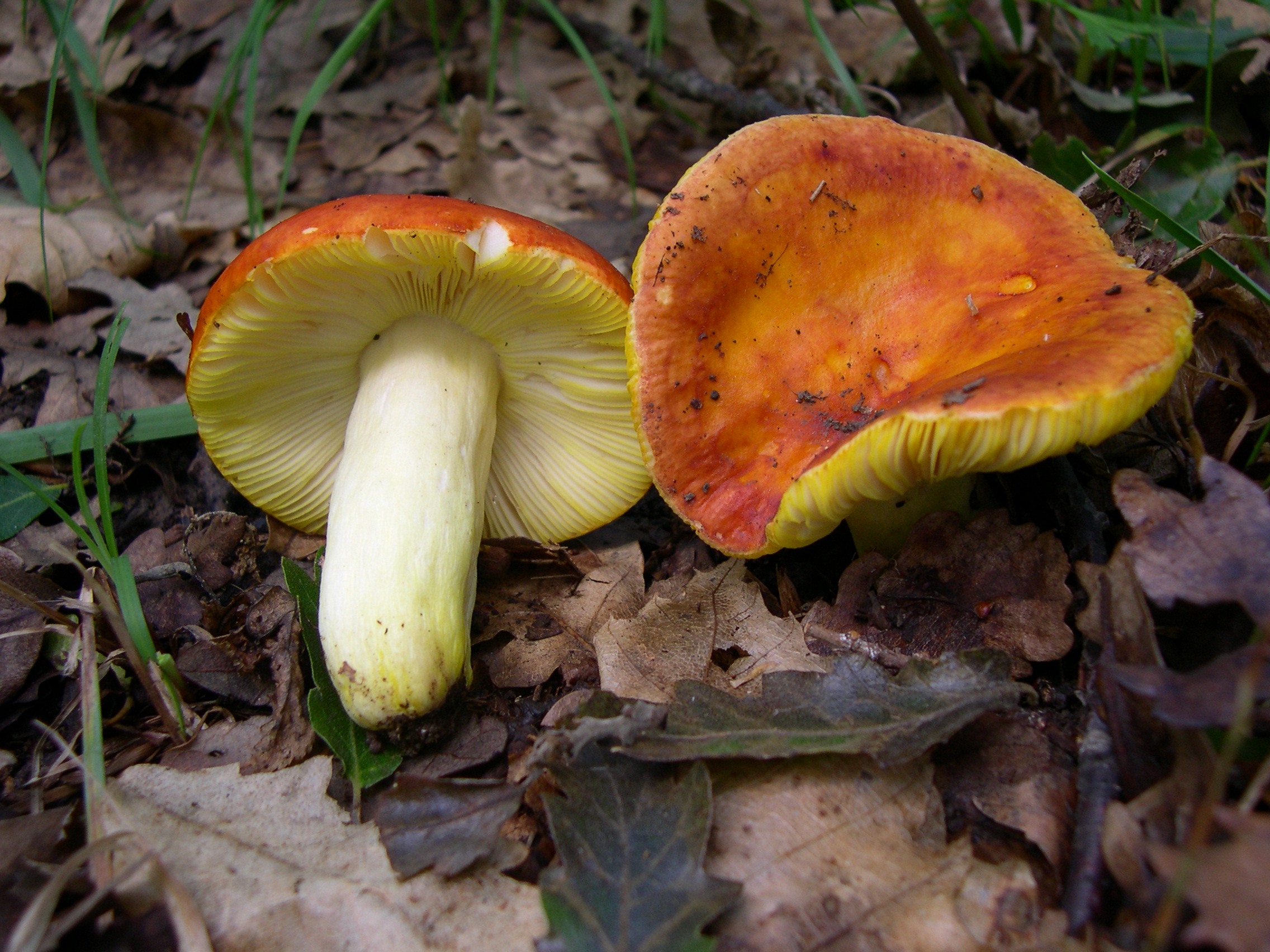
Russula aurea Pers. 1796

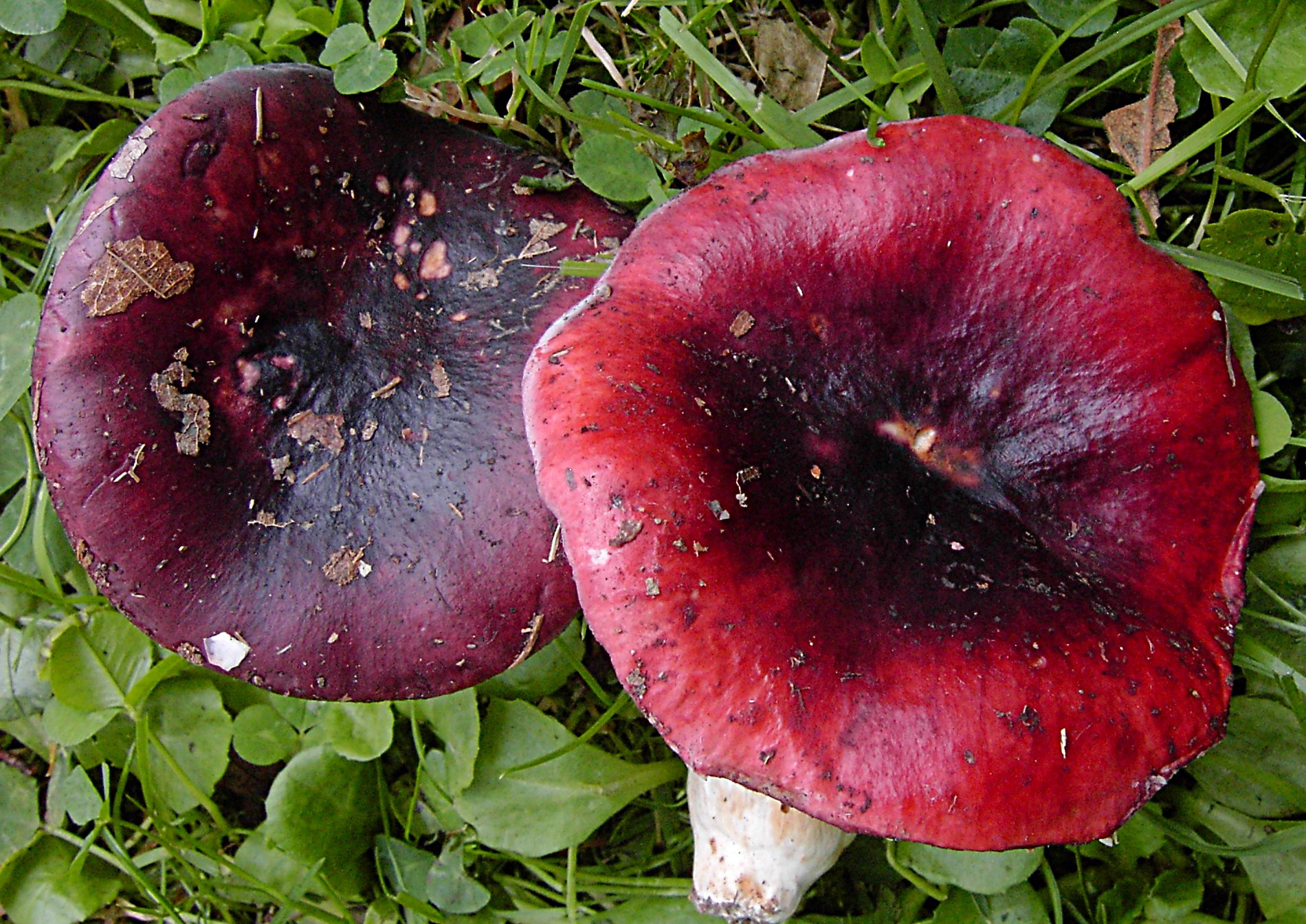
Russula atropurpurea(Krombh. 1845) Britzelm. 1893

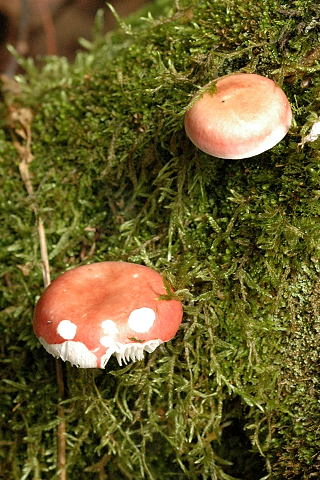
Russula atrorubens Quél. 1897

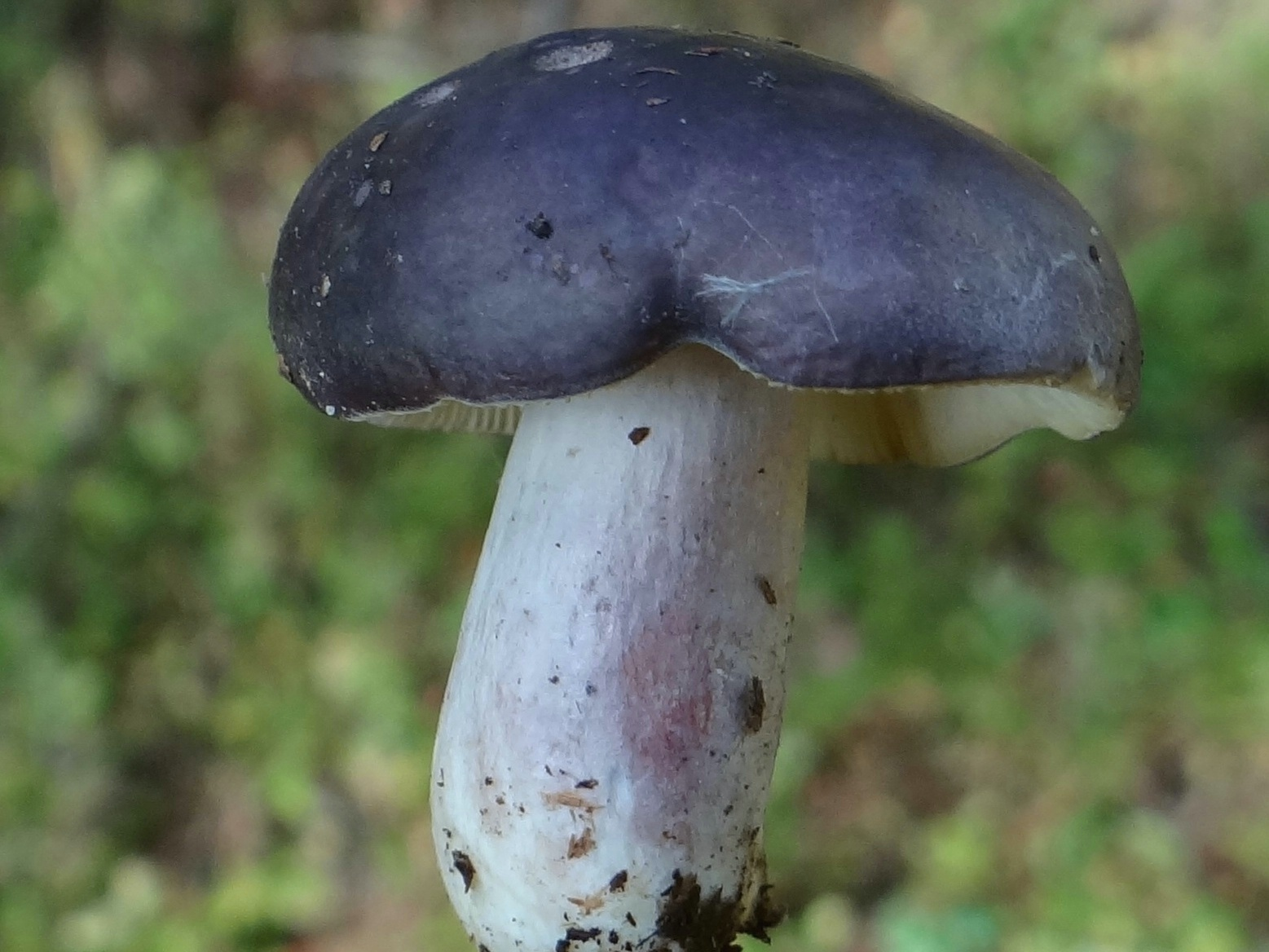
Russula azurea Bres. 1882

- Russula abbotensis K. Das & J.R. Sharma (2005)
- Russula abbottabadensis Saba & Adamčík (2019)
- Russula abietiphila Wisitr., H. Lee & Y.W. Lim (2019)
- Russula abietum (J. Blum) Bon (1983)
- Russula abscondita G.M. Jansen (2024)
- Russula absphaerocellaris X.Y. Sang & L. Fan (2016)
- Russula acerba (Singer & A.H. Sm.) Trappe & T.F. Elliott (2018)
- Russula aciculocystis Kauffman ex Bills & O.K. Mill. (1984)
- Russula acrialbida Manz, F. Hampe & Yorou (2025)
- Russula acriannulata Buyck (1993)
- Russula acrifolia Romagn. (1997)
- Russula acris Steinhaus (1888)
- Russula acriuscula Buyck (1988)
- Russula acrolamellata McNabb (1973)
- Russula acuminata Buyck (1988)
- Russula acutispora R. Heim (1971)
- Russula adalbertii Reumaux, Moënne-Locc. & Bidaud (1999)
- Russula adelae Čern. (1951)
- Russula admirabilis Beardslee & Burl. (1939)
- Russula adusta (Pers.) Fr. (1838)
- Russula adusto-densifolia Secr. ex Singer (1986)
- Russula adustoides R. Heim (1938)
- Russula adwanitekae A. Ghosh, K. Das & Buyck (2021)
- Russula aerina Romagn. (1962)
- Russula aeruginascens Peck (1901)
- Russula aeruginea Lindblad ex Fr. (1863)
- Russula affinis Burl. (1924)
- Russula africana R. Heim (1970)
- Russula afrodelica Buyck (2004)
- Russula agaricina (Kalchbr. ex Berk.) Trappe & T.F. Elliott (2018)
- Russula ahmadii Jabeen, Razaq, Niazi, I. Ahmad & Khalid (2017)
- Russula alachuana Murrill (1938)
- Russula alatoreticula K. Acharya, S. Khatua, A.K. Dutta & Paloi (2017)
- Russula alba Schulzer (1870)
- Russula albella Peck (1898)
- Russula albiclavipes Murrill (1946)
- Russula albida Peck (1887)
- Russula albidicremea Murrill (1939)
- Russula albidigleba (Singer & A.H. Sm.) Trappe & T.F. Elliott (2018)
- Russula albidoflava T. Lebel (2007)
- Russula albidogrisea Jing W. Li & L.H. Qiu (2017)
- Russula albidolutescens Gillet (1884 )
- Russula albidula Peck
- Russula albiduliformis Murrill (1943)
- Russula albiflavescens Murrill (1939)
- Russula albimarginata Murrill (1945)
- Russula alboareolata Hongo (1979)
- Russula albobrunnea T. Lebel (2007)
- Russula alboflava C.Y. Niu, W.Q. Qin & G.J. Li (2024)
- Russula albofloccosa Buyck (1990)
- Russula albolutea B. Chen & J.F. Liang (2021)
- Russula albolutescens McNabb (1973)
- Russula albonigra (Krombh.) Fr. (1874)
- Russula albonigroides Singer (1948)
- Russula alborosea Reumaux (1996)
- Russula albospissa Buyck (1989)
- Russula alcalinicola Burl. (1924)
- Russula alleinstanleyae T.F. Elliott & Trappe (2018)
- Russula allescheri Singer (1951)
- Russula allochroa McNabb (1973)
- Russula alnetorum Romagn. (1956)
- Russula alnicrispae I.L. Brunner (1989)
- Russula alpicola Trappe & T.F. Elliott (2018)
- Russula alpigenes (Bon) Bon (1993)
- Russula alpium Reumaux (2003)
- Russula alutacea (Fr.) Fr. (1838)
- Russula alutaceiformis Murrill (1943)
- Russula alveolata R. Heim (1968)
- Russula amaranthina A. Favre (2008)
- Russula amarissima Romagn. & E.-J. Gilbert (1943)
- Russula ambusta De Lange, Adamčík & F. Hampe (2021)
- Russula americana (Singer) Singer (1942)
- Russula amerorecondita Avis & Barajas (2019)
- Russula amethystina Quél. (1898)
- Russula ammophila (J.M. Vidal & Calonge) Trappe & T.F. Elliott (2018)
- Russula amnicola Singer (1983)
- Russula amoena Quél. (1881)
- Russula amoenata Britzelm. (1885)
- Russula amoenicolor Romagn. (1967) (Note: Several of Romagnesi's names published in the 50s and 60s did not include a reference to a type specimen and only became valid in 1967 when he published his Les Russules d'Europe et d'Afrique du Nord, which included type specifications, even though the original publications are frequently given as valid.)
- Russula amoenipes (Romagn. ex Bon) Bidaud, Moënne-Locc. & Reumaux (1996)
- Russula amoenoides Romagn. (1967)
- Russula amoenolens Romagn. (1952)
- Russula amygdaloides Kauffman (1918)
- Russula anatina Romagn. (1967)
- Russula anatolica Çolak & Kaygusuz (2025)
- Russula andaluciana T.F. Elliott & Trappe (2018)
- Russula angustispora Bills (1986)
- Russula anisata Murrill (1945)
- Russula anisopterae Buyck & E. Horak (1999)
- Russula annae Sarnari (1991)
- Russula annulata R. Heim (1938)
- Russula annulata R. Heim (1938)
- Russula annulatobadia Beeli (1936)
- Russula annulatolutea Beeli (1936)
- Russula annulatosquamosa Beeli (1936)
- Russula anomala Peck (1898)
- Russula anthracina Romagn. (1962)
- Russula antsikana Buyck & Randrianjohany (2020)
- Russula aosma Singer (1952)
- Russula appalachiensis Singer (1948)
- Russula appendiculata K. Das, S.L. Mill. & J.R. Sharma (2006)
- Russula aquosa Leclair (1933)
- Russula archaea R. Heim (1938)
- Russula archaeofistulosa Buyck (2004)
- Russula archaeosuberis Sarnari (1998)
- Russula arcyospora Singer (1990)
- Russula arenaria Singer (1947)
- Russula arenicola (S.L. Mill. & D. Mitch.) Trappe & T.F. Elliott (2018)
- Russula areolata Buyck (1989)
- Russula argyracea Čern. & H. Raab (1955)
- Russula arnoldae Murrill (1940)
- Russula arnouldii Maire ex Barbier (1911)
- Russula aromatica Trappe & T.F. Elliott (2018)
- Russula arpalices Sarnari (1994)
- Russula arunii Paloi, A.K. Dutta & K. Acharya (2017)
- Russula ashihoi K. Das, A. Ghosh, Buyck & Hembrom (2020 )
- Russula astringens Burl. (1915)
- Russula atramentosa Sarnari (1992)
- Russula atrata Shaffer (1962)
- Russula atroaeruginea G.J. Li, Q. Zhao & H.A. Wen (2013)
- Russula atroamethystina Alfaro, Singer & L.D. Gómez (1997)
- Russula atrochermesina Y.Lu Chen & Jun F. Liang (2024)
- Russula atrofusca Reumaux, Moënne-Locc. & Bidaud (1999)
- Russula atroglauca Einhell. (1980)
- Russula atropurpurea (Krombh.) Britzelm. (1893) (Note: Russula atropurpurea is acknowledged as an illegitimate later homonym, but in the absence of agreement regarding the better name to use to replace it, continues to be used.) – dark-purple russula
- Russula atrorosea Schwalb (1891)
- Russula atrorubens Quél. (1898)
- Russula atrovinosa Buyck (1989)
- Russula atroviolacea Burl. (1915)
- Russula atrovirens Beeli (1928)
- Russula atroviridis Buyck (1990)
- Russula attenuata Carteret & Reumaux (2006)
- Russula aucarum Singer (1975)
- Russula aucklandica McNabb (1973)
- Russula aurantiaca (Jul. Schäff.) Romagn. (1967)
- Russula aurantiicolor Krombh. (1845)
- Russula aurantiocutis Michelin & E. Campo (2021)
- Russula aurantioflammans Ruots., Sarnari & Vauras (1998)
- Russula aurantioflava Kiran & Khalid (2019)
- Russula aurantiofloccosa Buyck (1990)
- Russula aurantiolutea Kauffman (1909)
- Russula aurantiomarginata Buyck (1989)
- Russula aurantionigrescens Jurkeit, Grauw. & J. Albers (2010)
- Russula aurantiopectinata F. Hampe & Manz (2021)
- Russula aurantiophylla Buyck & Ducousso (2004)
- Russula aurantirosea T. Lebel (2017)
- Russula aurea Pers. (1796) (= R. aurata) (Note: William Withering's 1801 Agaricus auratus was for a long time believed to be the oldest basionym.) – gilded brittlegill
- Russula aureola Buyck (1990)
- Russula aureorubra K. Das, A. Ghosh, Baghela & Buyck (2017)
- Russula aureotacta R. Heim (1937)
- Russula aureoviridis Jing W. Li & L.H. Qiu (2017)
- Russula aurora Krombh. (1845)
- Russula australiensis Cooke & Massee (1887)
- Russula australirosea Murrill (1946)
- Russula australis McNabb (1973)
- Russula austrodelica Singer (1969)
- Russula austromontana Singer (1989)
- Russula autumnalis Velen. (1920)
- Russula avellaneiceps Fatto (1999)
- Russula ayubiana M. Kiran & Khalid (2021)
- Russula azurea Bres. (1882)

=== B ===
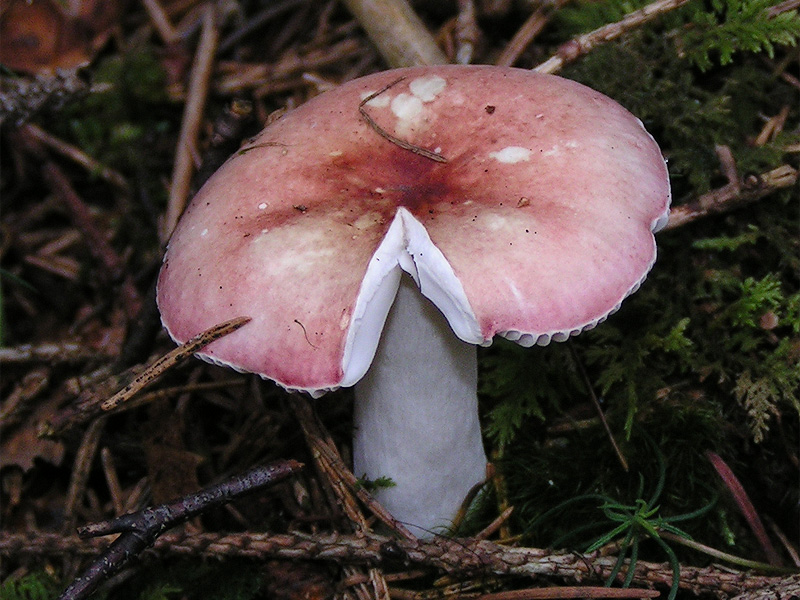
Russula betularum Hora 1960

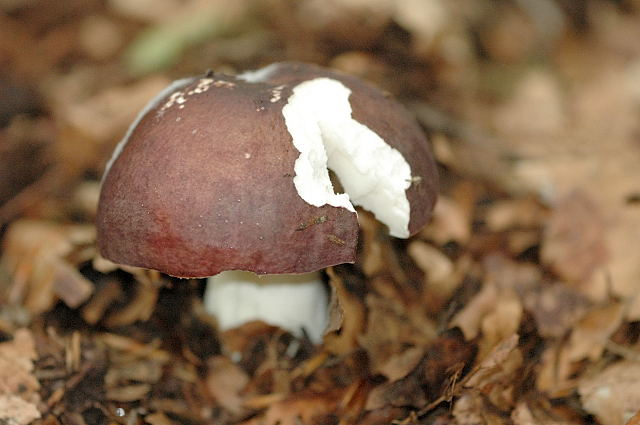
Russula brunneoviolacea Crawshay 1930

- Russula bachii Čern. & H. Raab (1955)
- Russula badia Quél. (1881) – burning brittlegill
- Russula ballouii Peck (1913)
- Russula balpinea (Grgur.) T. Lebel (2017)
- Russula baniyakundensis A. Ghosh, K. Das & D. Chakr. (2020)
- Russula banwatchanensis Sommai, Pinruan, Somrith. & Luangsa-ard (2022)
- Russula baruthica Jurkeit & Gubitz (2010)
- Russula basifurcata Peck (1885)
- Russula basiturgida Buyck (1990)
- Russula batistae Singer (1955)
- Russula bavarica J.M. Vidal (2019)
- Russula beardslei Burl. (1939)
- Russula beenkenii Manz, F. Hampe & M. Piepenbr. (2025)
- Russula begonia G.J. Li, T.Z. Liu & T.Z. Wei (2023)
- Russula bella Hongo (1968)
- Russula bellissima Manz & F. Hampe (2022)
- Russula benghalensis S. Paloi & K. Acharya (2020)
- Russula benwooi Bazzic., D. Mill. & Buyck (2017)
- Russula bernardii Buyck (2004)
- Russula betulae Bidaud (1996)
- Russula betularum Hora (1960) – birch brittlegill
- Russula betulina Burl. (1915)
- Russula bhurbanensis Razzaq, Naseer & Khalid (2023)
- Russula bicolor Burl. (1913)
- Russula billsii S.L. Mill. (2004)
- Russula binchuanensis H.A. Wen & J.Z. Ying (2001)
- Russula binganensis Beeli (1928)
- Russula bispora (T. Lebel) T. Lebel (2017)
- Russula blackfordiae Peck (1910)
- Russula blanda Burl. (1915)
- Russula blennia Buyck (2018)
- Russula blumiana Bon (1986)
- Russula blumii Bon (1986)
- Russula boddingii Hembrom, D. Chakr., A. Ghosh & K. Das (2023)
- Russula boedijnii Trappe & T.F. Elliott (2018)
- Russula bohemiae Reumaux (2003)
- Russula bona Schwalb (1896)
- Russula bonii Buyck (1995)
- Russula boninensis S. Ito & S. Imai (1940)
- Russula boranupensis (T. Lebel) T. Lebel (2017)
- Russula borealis Kauffman (1909)
- Russula boyacensis Singer (1963)
- Russula brasiliensis Singer (1948)
- Russula brevipes Peck (1890)
- Russula brevipileocystidiata X.Y. Sang & L. Fan (2016)
- Russula brevis Romagn. ex Bon (1987)
- Russula brevispora Y.Lu Chen & Jun F. Liang (2023)
- Russula brevissima Moënne-Locc. (1996)
- Russula brunneipes Murrill (1945)
- Russula brunneoalba De Marb. (1977)
- Russula brunneoannulata Buyck (1990)
- Russula brunneoaurantiaca A.K. Dutta, N. Roy & Beypih (2023)
- Russula brunneocystidiata X.H. Wang & L.H. Huang (2023)
- Russula brunneoderma Buyck (1989)
- Russula brunneofloccosa Buyck (1990)
- Russula brunneola Burl. (1915)
- Russula brunneonigra T. Lebel (2007)
- Russula brunneopurpurea Jabeen & Khalid (2017)
- Russula brunneorigida Buyck (1988)
- Russula brunneovinacea X.M. Jiang, Yang K. Li & J.F. Liang (2017)
- Russula brunneoviolacea Crawshay (1930)
- Russula brunnescens Murrill (1946)
- Russula bubalina J.W. Li & L.H. Qiu (2019)
- Russula bubalinoides L.H.D. Zhao & L.P. Zhang (2025)
- Russula burgeae Thiers (1997)
- Russula burkei Burl. (1924)
- Russula burlinghamiae Singer (1938)
- Russula bururiensis Buyck (1988)
- Russula butyroindica K. Das & Buyck (2017)
- Russula buyckii K. Acharya, Paloi & A.K. Dutta (2016)
- Russula byssina G.J. Li & Chun Y. Deng (2020)

=== C ===
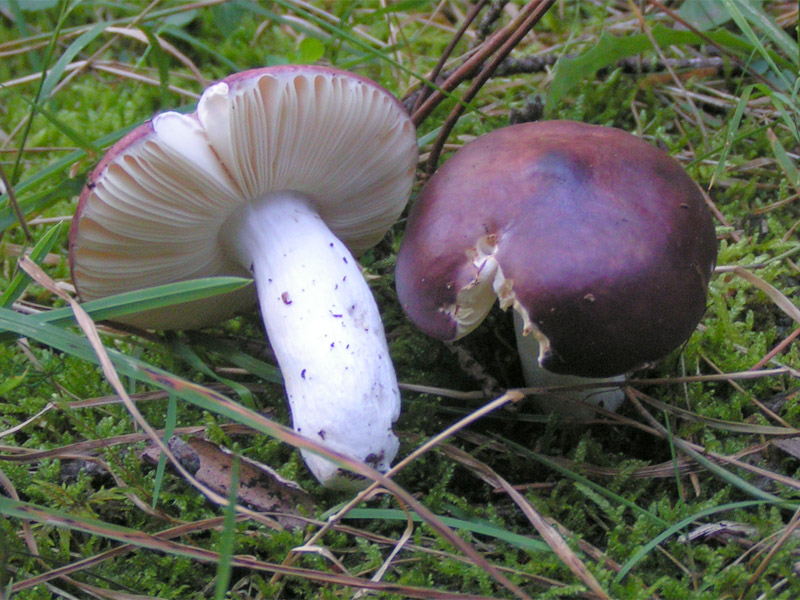
Russula caerulea (Pers. 1801) Fr. 1838

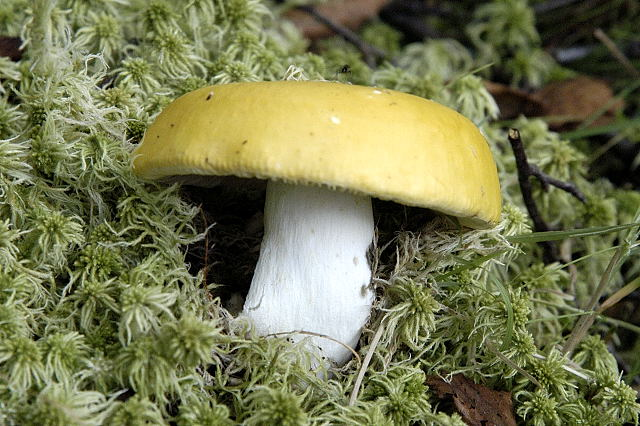
Russula claroflava Grove 1888

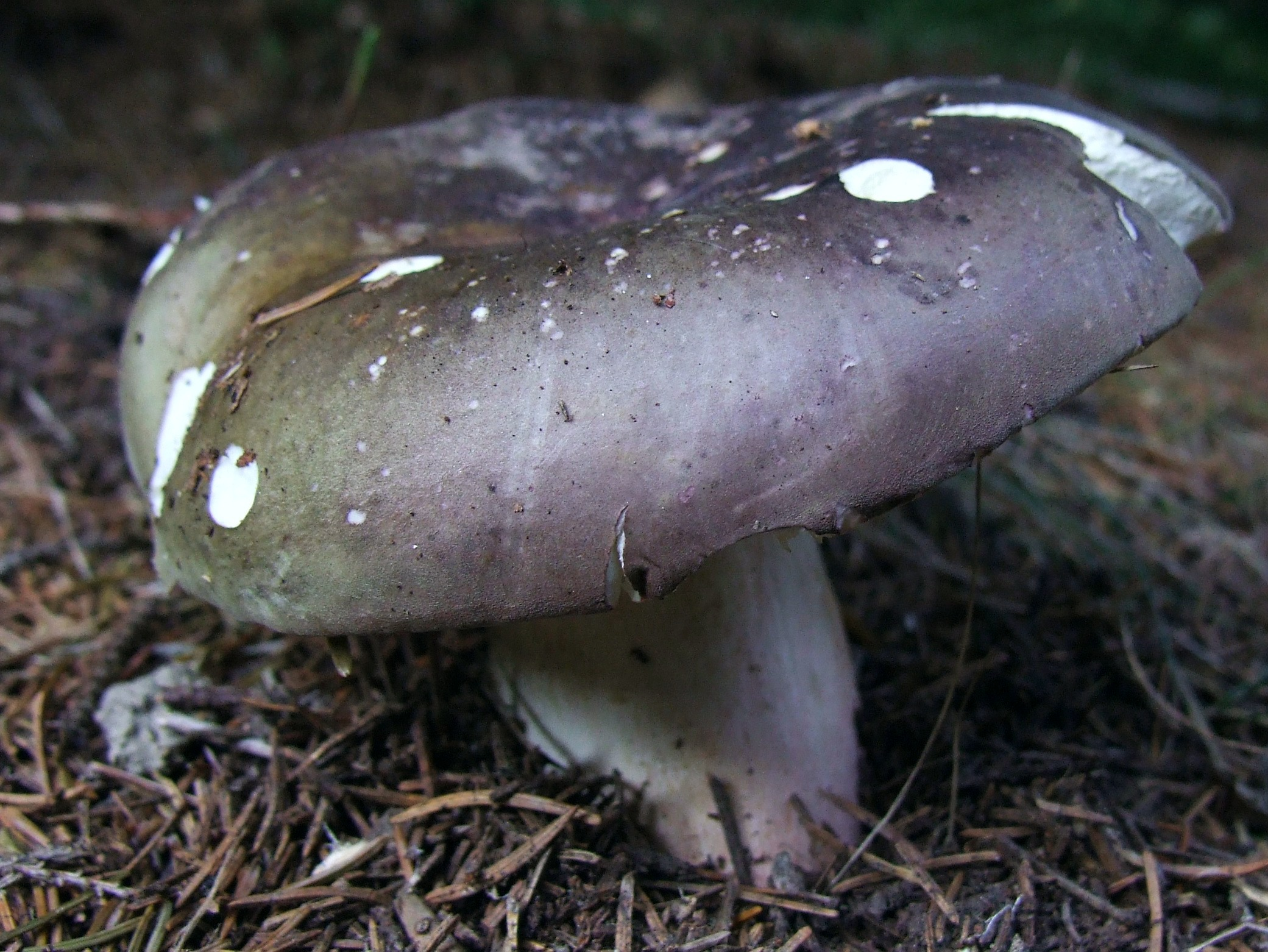
Russula cyanoxantha (Schaeff. 1774) Fr. 1863

- Russula caerulea Fr. (1838) (Note: The attribution "(Pers.) Fr." is more common, but Persoon's 1801 Agaricus caeruleus was an homonym of a name published by James Bolton in his 1788 An History of Fungusses, Growing about Halifax, and thus illegitimate.)
- Russula caeruleoanulata Douanla-Meli (2009)
- Russula caeruleomalva J. Blum (1952)
- Russula californica (Singer & A.H. Sm.) Trappe & T.F. Elliott (2018)
- Russula californiensis Burl. (1936)
- Russula callainomarginis Jun F. Liang & J. Song (2022)
- Russula calvitiosa Kučera (1926)
- Russula camarophylla Romagn. (1967)
- Russula campestris (Romagn.) Romagn. (1967)
- Russula campinensis (Singer) T.W. Henkel, Aime & S.L. Mill. (2000)
- Russula candida (Tul. & C. Tul.) J.M. Vidal (2019)
- Russula candidissima J.M. Vidal, Pasabán & Chachuła (2019)
- Russula cantharellicola D. Arora & N.H. Nguyen (2014)
- Russula capensis A. Pearson (1951)
- Russula capillaris Buyck (2019)
- Russula capitis-orae (Dring) T. Lebel (2017)
- Russula captiosa Reumaux (2003)
- Russula carbonaria R. Heim & Gilles (1971)
- Russula cardinalis Looney (2022)
- Russula carmelensis M.M. Moser, Binyam. & Aviz.-Hersh. (1977)
- Russula carmesina R. Heim (1970)
- Russula carminipes J. Blum (1954)
- Russula carpini R. Girard & Heinem. (1956)
- Russula cartaginis Buyck & Halling (2004)
- Russula cascadensis Shaffer (1964)
- Russula castanopsidis Hongo (1973)
- Russula castellanoi Trappe & T.F. Elliott (2018)
- Russula catillus H. Lee, M.S. Park & Y.W. Lim (2017)
- Russula caucaensis Singer (1989)
- Russula cavipes Britzelm. (1891)
- Russula cellulata Buyck (1989)
- Russula cerasina C. Martín (1894)
- Russula cerea (Soehner) J.M. Vidal (2019)
- Russula cernohorskyi Singer (1935)
- Russula cerolens Shaffer (1972)
- Russula cessans A. Pearson (1950)
- Russula chamaeleon Singer (1937)
- Russula changbaiensis G.J. Li & H.A. Wen (2013)
- Russula cheelii Cleland (1934)
- Russula chichuensis W.F. Chiu (1945)
- Russula chiui G.J. Li & H.A. Wen (2015)
- Russula chlorantha Velen. (1920)
- Russula chlorina G.J. Li & Chun Y. Deng (2024)
- Russula chlorineolens Trappe & T.F. Elliott (2018)
- Russula chlorinosma Burl. (1924)
- Russula chloroides (Krombh.) Bres. (1900) – blue band brittlegill
- Russula choptae A. Ghosh & K. Das (2019)
- Russula chrysantha C.Y. Niu, T.Z. Liu & G.J. Li (2024)
- Russula chrysea G.J. Li & Chun Y. Deng (2024)
- Russula cicatricata Romagn. ex Bon (1987)
- Russula ciliata Buyck (1987)
- Russula cinerascens Beardslee (1918)
- Russula cinerea R. Heim (1938)
- Russula cinerella Pat. (1924)
- Russula cinereopurpurea Krombh. 1845
- Russula cinereovinosa Fatto (2002)
- Russula cinereoviolacea Allesch. (1886)
- Russula cinerescentipes Moënne-Locc. (1996)
- Russula cingulata Buyck & E. Horak (1999)
- Russula cinnabarina Berk. (1851)
- Russula cinnamomea Banning (1881)
- Russula cistoadelpha M.M. Moser & Trimbach (1981)
- Russula cistorum Bidaud (1996)
- Russula citrinipes R. Heim (1938)
- Russula citrinochlora Singer (1938)
- Russula citrinocincta Reumaux (1996)
- Russula citrinolilacina Reumaux (1996)
- Russula citrinosulcata Jul. Schäff. (1927)
- Russula clariana R. Heim ex Kuyper & Vuure (1985)
- Russula claroflava Grove (1888) – yellow swamp russula
- Russula claroviridis E.H.L. Krause (1929)
- Russula clavata (T. Lebel) T. Lebel (2017)
- Russula clavatohyphata R.P. Bhatt, A. Ghosh, Buyck & K. Das (2019)
- Russula claviceps Velen. (1920)
- Russula clavipes Velen. (1920)
- Russula clavulus B. Chen & J.F. Liang (2021)
- Russula clelandii O.K. Mill. & R.N. Hilton (1987)
- Russula clementinae Reumaux (1996)
- Russula clitocybiformis Murrill (1940)
- Russula clitocyboides (Henn.) Verbeken & Buyck (1996)
- Russula coccinea Massee (1898)
- Russula cochisei Fatto (2000)
- Russula coffeata Perr.-Bertr. (1983)
- Russula cognata R. Socha (2011)
- Russula collina Velen. (1920)
- Russula collubrina T. Lebel (2017)
- Russula columbaria Velen. (1920)
- Russula columbiana Singer (1963)
- Russula columbicolor Jurkeit & Herches (2007)
- Russula compacta Frost (1879)
- Russula compactoides K. Das, A. Ghosh & Buyck (2017)
- Russula compressa Buyck (1989)
- Russula concolora Buyck (1988)
- Russula confertissima Kučera (1929)
- Russula congoana Pat. (1914)
- Russula conicipes Carteret & Reumaux (2006)
- Russula coniferarum Jurkeit (2024)
- Russula conjugata Velen. (1920)
- Russula consobrina (Fr.) Fr. (1838)
- Russula consobrinoides R. Heim (1938)
- Russula convivialis Sarnari (1995)
- Russula cookeana Reumaux (1996)
- Russula cooperiana Buyck & E. Horak (2023)
- Russula corallina Burl. (1915)
- Russula cordata Looney (2022)
- Russula corinthii-rubra Burl. (1915)
- Russula cornicolor Manz & F. Hampe (2021)
- Russula coronaspora Y. Song (2021)
- Russula coronata Manz & F. Hampe (2025)
- Russula cortinarioides Buyck, Adamčík, D.P. Lewis & V. Hofst. (2015)
- Russula costaricensis Singer (1983)
- Russula costatispora (T. Lebel) T. Lebel (2017)
- Russula crassibasidiata T. Lebel, Davoodian & Castellano (2022)
- Russula crassotunicata Singer (1938)
- Russula crataegorum Murrill (1945)
- Russula cremeirosea Murrill (1946)
- Russula cremeirubra Murrill (1946)
- Russula cremeoavellanea Singer (1936)
- Russula cremeoflavescens Reumaux (1996)
- Russula cremeolilacina Pegler (1980)
- Russula cremeolilacinoides Reumaux (1997)
- Russula cremeo-ochracea McNabb (1973)
- Russula cremicolor G.J. Li & C.Y. Deng (2020)
- Russula cremoricolor Earle (1902)
- Russula crenulata Burl. (1913)
- Russula cretata Romagn. ex Reumaux (1996)
- Russula cristata Romagn. (1962)
- Russula cristulispora Singer (1941)
- Russula crocea Pers. (1796)
- Russula crucensis L.D. Gómez (1997)
- Russula cruenta G.J. Li & Chun Y. Deng (2024)
- Russula cruentata Quél. & Schulzer (1885)
- Russula crustosa Peck (1887)
- Russula cuprea Krombh. (1845)
- Russula cupreoaffinis Sarnari (1998)
- Russula cupreola Sarnari (1990)
- Russula cupreoviolacea J. Blum (1954)
- Russula curtipes F.H. Møller & Jul. Schäff. (1935)
- Russula curtispora Moënne-Locc. (2003)
- Russula cyanea R. Heim (1970)
- Russula cyanescens J. Kickx f. (1842)
- Russula cyanoxantha (Schaeff.) Fr. (1863) – the charcoal burner
- Russula cyclosperma Buyck (1990)
- Russula cylindrica Yu Song (2023)
- Russula cynorhodon Manz & F. Hampe (2021)
- Russula cystidiosa Murrill (1940)

=== D–E ===
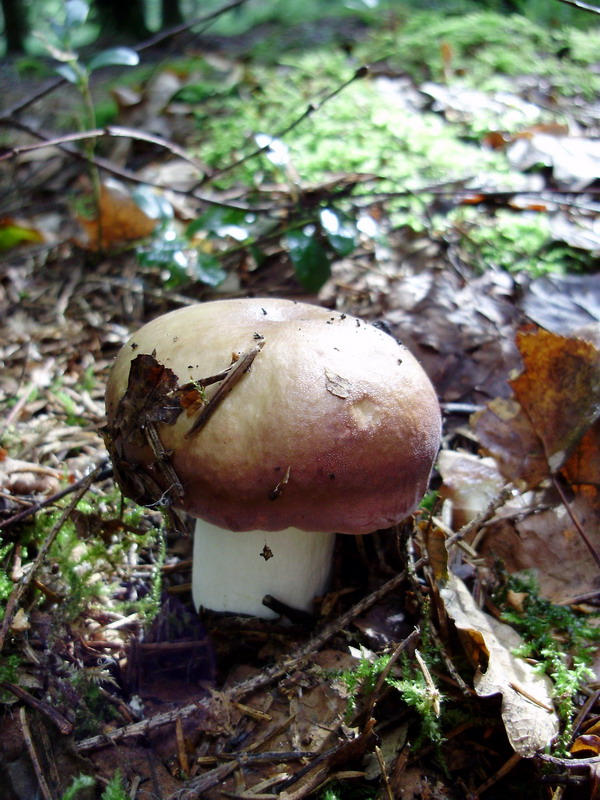
Russula decolorans (Fr. 1821) Fr. 1838

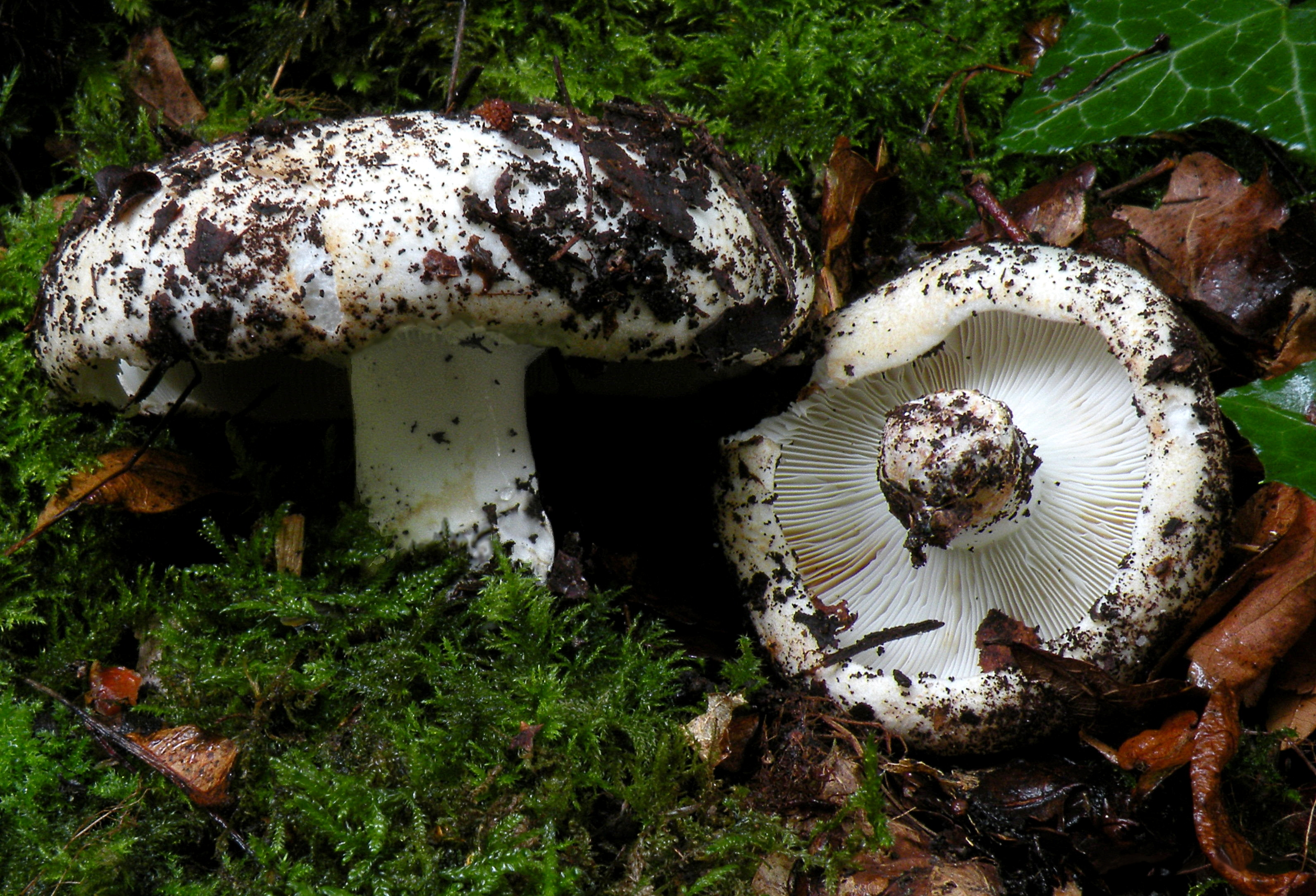
Russula delica Fr. 1838

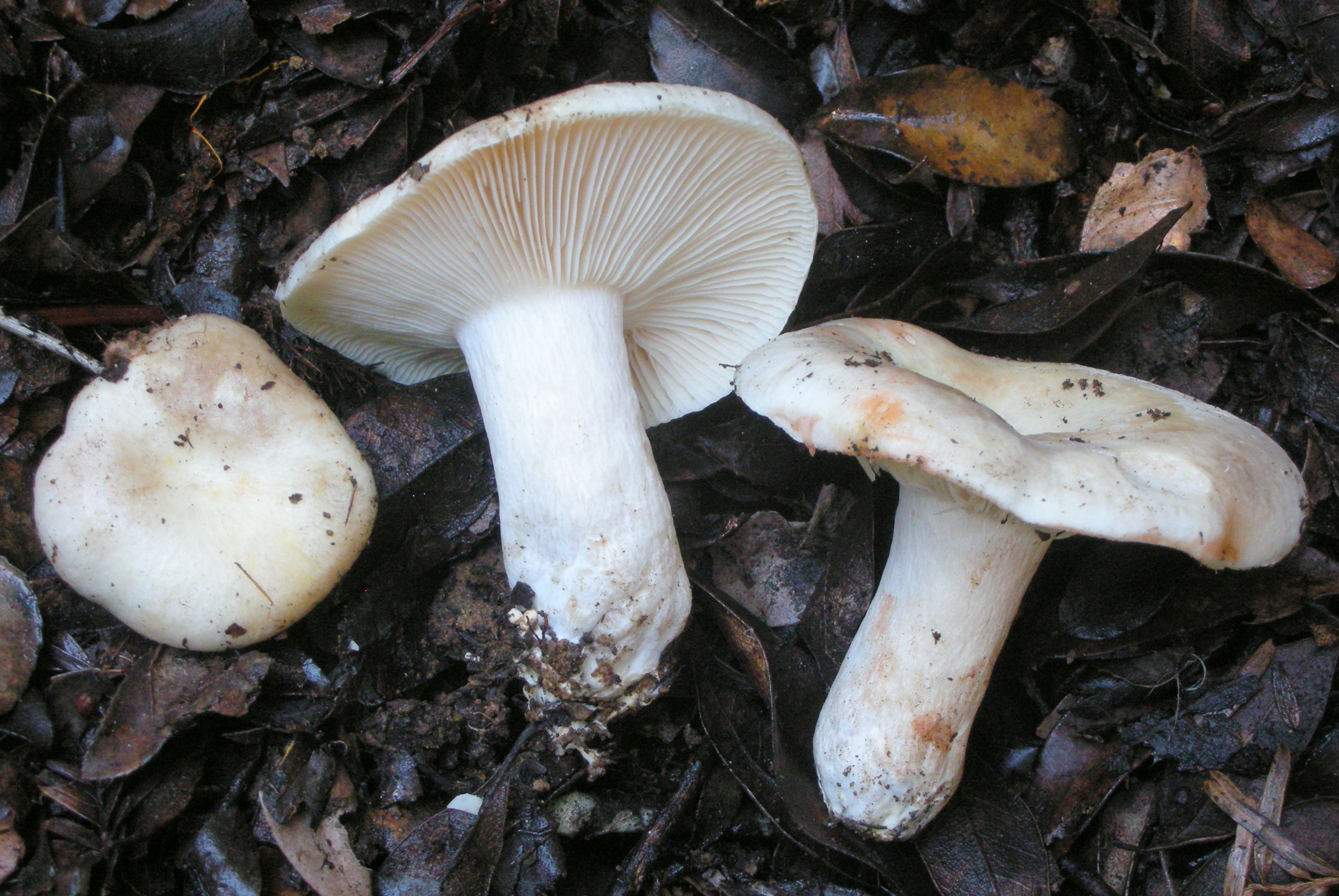
Russula densifolia Secr. 1833

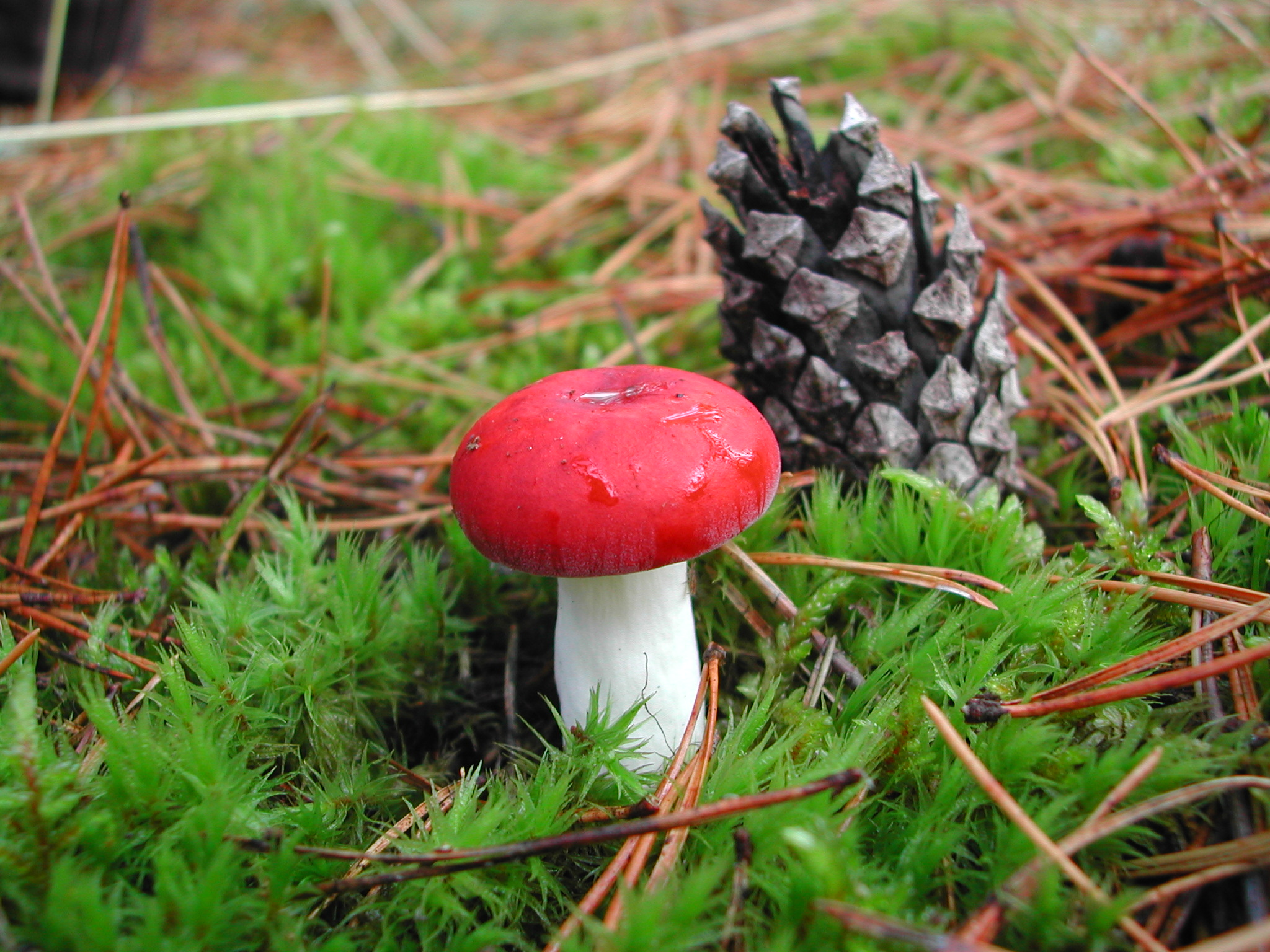
Russula emetica (Schaeff. 1774) Pers. 1796

- Russula dadmunii Singer (1948)
- Russula dafianus K. Das & J.R. Sharma (2005)
- Russula danksiae T. Lebel & Castellano (2022)
- Russula darjeelingensis Paloi, K. Acharya & K. Das (2018)
- Russula davisii Burl. (1918)
- Russula decaryi R. Heim (1938)
- Russula deceptiva Romagn. (1967)
- Russula decipiens (Singer) Bon (1985)
- Russula declinata Buyck (1990)
- Russula decolorans (Fr.) Fr. (1838) – copper brittlegill
- Russula decora Shaffer (1962)
- Russula delica Fr. (1838) – milk-white russula
- Russula delicatoides J. Blum (1968)
- Russula deliciosa J. Schröt. (1889)
- Russula delicula Romagn. (1945)
- Russula denigrata Pidlich-Aigner (2015)
- Russula dennisii Singer ex Buyck (1999)
- Russula densifolia Secr. ex Gillet (1876) – crowded brittlegill
- Russula densissima Romagn. (1980)
- Russula deodarae D. Chakr. & A. Ghosh (2025)
- Russula depallescens R. Socha (2011)
- Russula depauperata (Singer & A.H. Sm.) Trappe & T.F. Elliott (2018)
- Russula derelicta Reumaux (1999)
- Russula deremensis Henn. (1902)
- Russula dhakuriana K. Das, J.R. Sharma & S.L. Mill. (2006)
- Russula diaboli Singer (1958)
- Russula diffusa Buyck (1988)
- Russula dinghuensis J.B. Zhang & L.H. Qiu (2017)
- Russula dipigmentata Singer (1989)
- Russula discoidea N.K. Zeng, Y.X. Han & Zhi Q. Liang (2023)
- Russula discolor Buyck & Bougher (2023)
- Russula discopus R. Heim (1970)
- Russula disparilis Burl. (1918)
- Russula dissimulans Shaffer (1962)
- Russula diversicolor Pegler (1980)
- Russula dodgei Trappe & T.F. Elliott (2018)
- Russula dominguezii (Mor.-Arr., J. Gómez & Calonge) Trappe & T.F. Elliott (2018)
- Russula dryadicola R. Fellner & Landa (1993)
- Russula dryophila Sarnari (1987)
- Russula dubdiana K. Das, Atri & Buyck (2013)
- Russula dulcior Reumaux (2011)
- Russula dulcis Schulzer (1881)
- Russula duportii W. Phillips (1884)
- Russula dura Burl. (1924)
- Russula durangensis (Guzmán) Trappe & T.F. Elliott (2018)
- Russula earlei Peck (1903)
- Russula eburnea (T. Lebel) T. Lebel (2017)
- Russula eburneoareolata Hongo (1973)
- Russula echidna G.M. Gates, Caboň & Jančovič. (2019)
- Russula echinosperma R. Heim & Gilles (1971)
- Russula echinospora Singer (1940)
- Russula edulis Buyck (2008)
- Russula eildonensis (G.W. Beaton, Pegler & T.W.K. Young) T. Lebel (2017)
- Russula elatior Lindblad (1901)
- Russula ellenae Thiers (1997)
- Russula ellipsospora (Zeller) Trappe & T.F. Elliott (2018)
- Russula emetica (Schaeff.) Pers. (1796) – the sickener
- Russula emeticicolor Jul. Schäff. (1937)
- Russula eogranulata Secr. ex Singer (1989)
- Russula eperythra Singer, Alfaro & L.D. Gómez (1997)
- Russula epitheliosa Singer (1983)
- Russula erubescens Zvára (1933)
- Russula erumpens Cleland & Cheel (1919) – erupting mushroom
- Russula erythrocephala Francini (2018)
- Russula esperanzae Corrales & Ortiz-Suarez (2025)
- Russula estriata X.H. Wang & Buyck (2024)
- Russula exalbicans (Pers.) Melzer & Zvára (1928)
- Russula extramaculata Trappe & T.F. Elliott (2018)

=== F ===
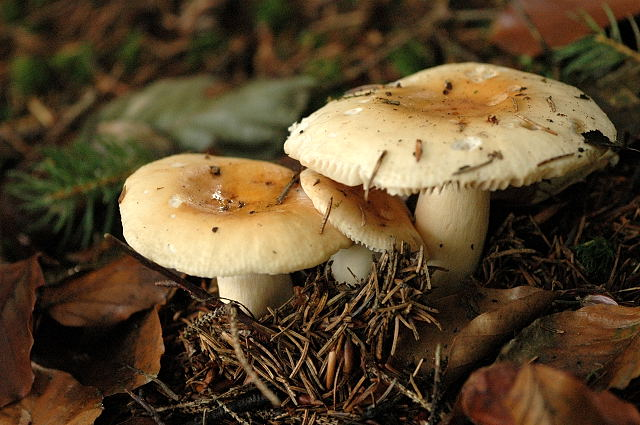
Russula fellea (Fr. 1821) Fr. 1838

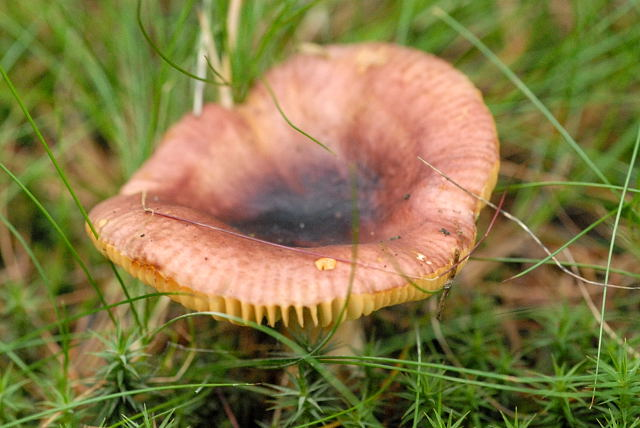
Russula firmula Jul.Schäff. 1940

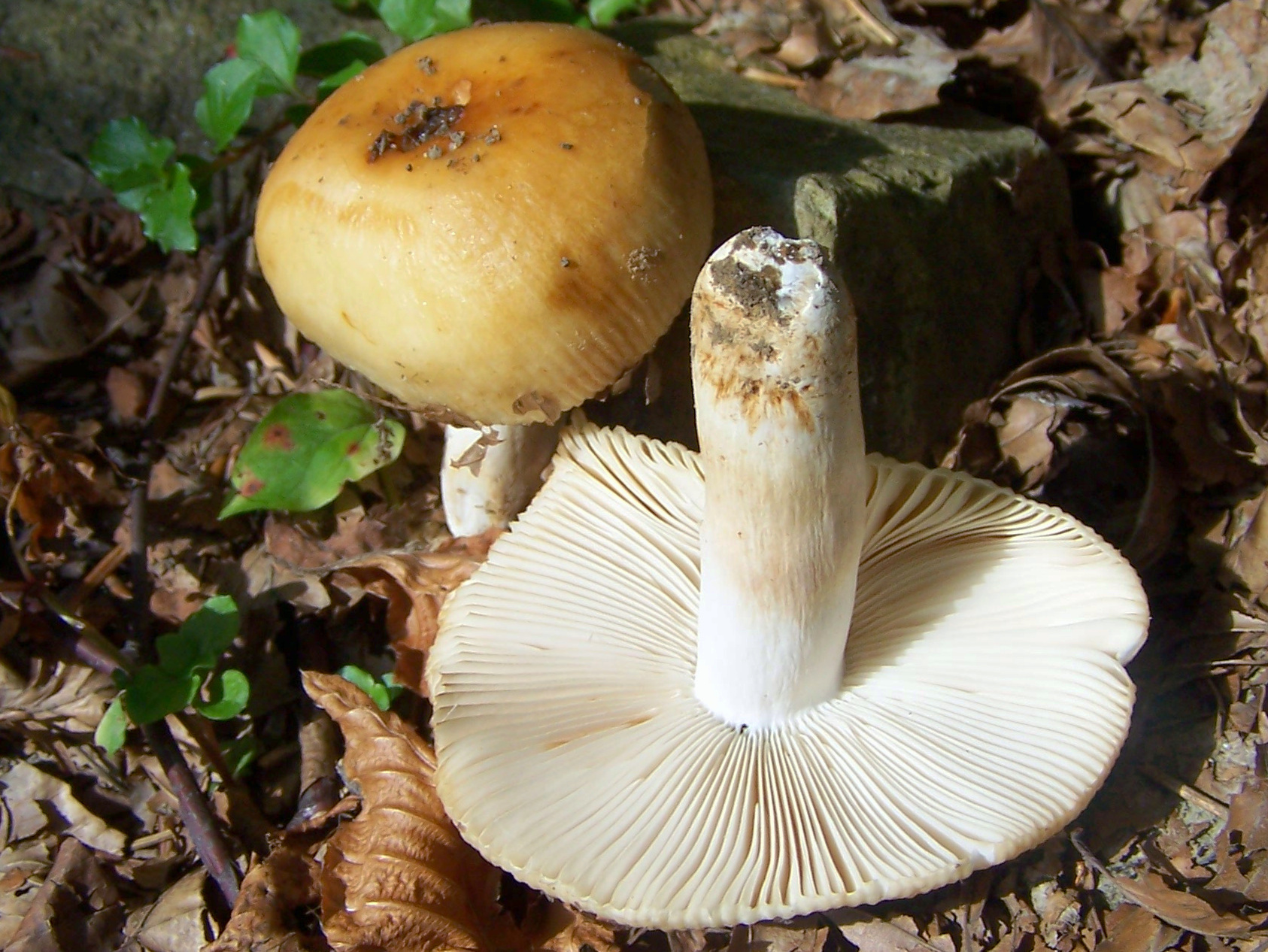
Russula foetens Pers. 1796

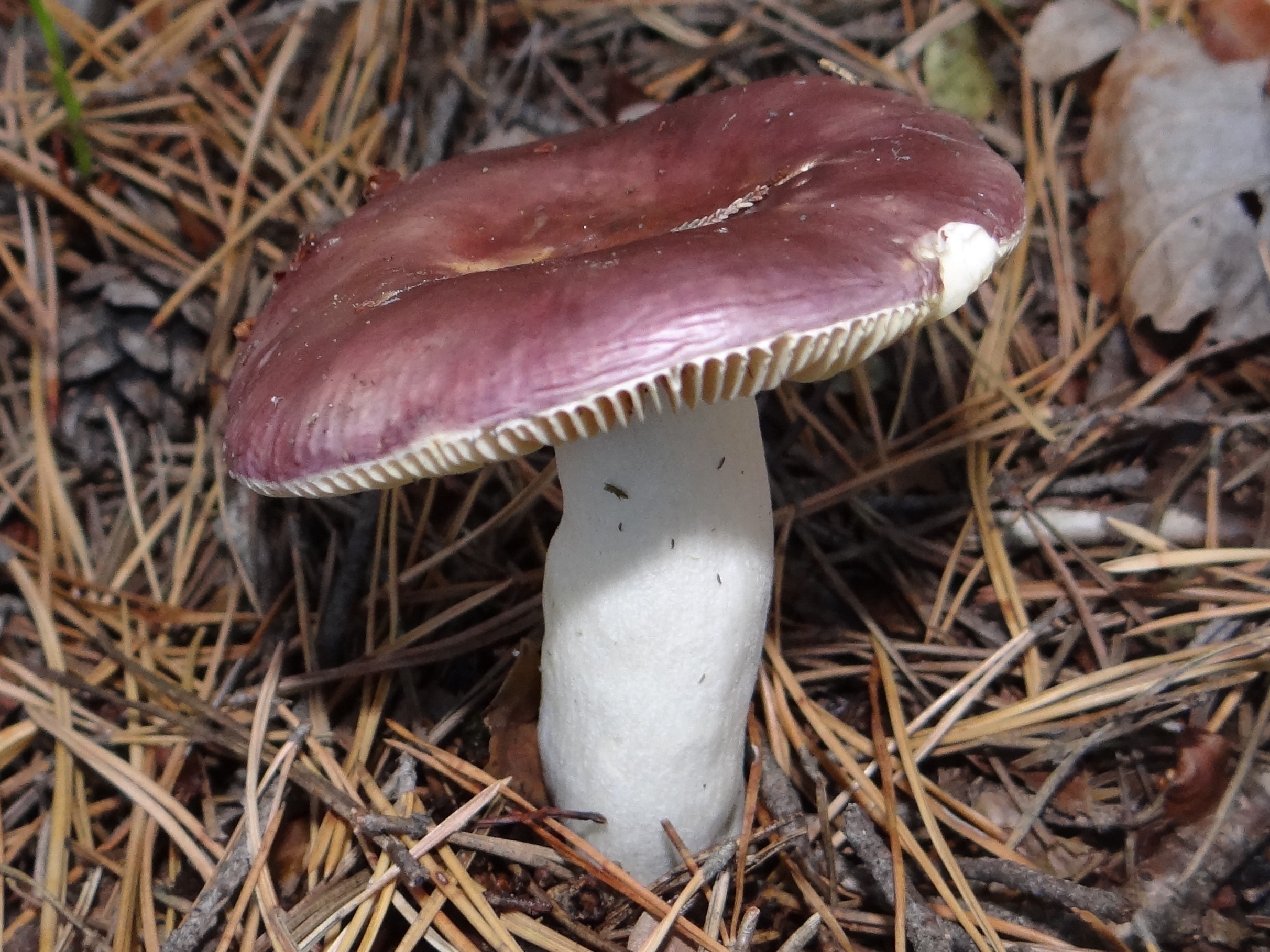
Russula fragilis(Pers. 1801) Fr. 1838

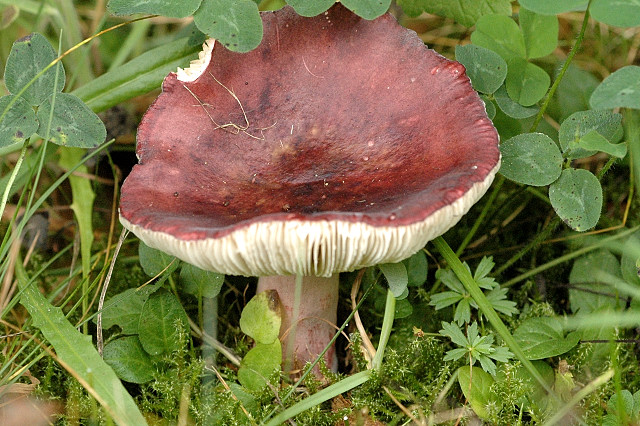
Russula atropurpurea Bon 1975

- Russula fagetorum Velen. (1920)
- Russula faginea Romagn. (1967)
- Russula fanjing Fang Li (2021)
- Russula farinipes Romell (1893)
- Russula fastigiata Fatto (2002)
- Russula fattoensis Buyck (2004)
- Russula faustiana Sarnari (1992)
- Russula favrei M.M. Moser (1979)
- Russula fellea (Fr.) Fr. (1838) – geranium-scented russula
- Russula felleicolor Bon & Jamoni (1993)
- Russula ferreri Singer (1936)
- Russula ferrotincta Singer (1945)
- Russula ferruginascens (Singer & A.H. Sm.) Trappe & T.F. Elliott (2018)
- Russula ferruginea Corrales & Manz (2022)
- Russula fimbriata Buyck (1987)
- Russula firmula Jul. Schäff. (1940)
- Russula fissurata Sanon & Buyck (2014)
- Russula fistulosa R. Heim (1938)
- Russula flavescens Y.Lu Chen & Jun F. Liang (2023)
- Russula flaviceps Peck (1901)
- Russula flavida Frost ex Peck (1880)
- Russula flavisiccans Bills (1989)
- Russula flavispora Romagn. (1967)
- Russula flavobrunnea Buyck (1990)
- Russula flavobrunnescens A. Kong & Buyck (2019)
- Russula flavocitrina J. Blum ex Bon (1986)
- Russula flavoides Pidlich-Aigner (2012)
- Russula flavorubescens Jurkeit, H. Grünert & R. Grünert (2024)
- Russula fleischeriana Henn. (1899)
- Russula floccosa Lj.N. Vassiljeva (1950)
- Russula flocculosa Burl. (1915)
- Russula florae Manz & F. Hampe (2025)
- Russula floridana Murrill (1940)
- Russula floriformis M. Vera & A. Corrales (2021)
- Russula fluvialis Taipale, Ruots. & Kälviäinen (2019)
- Russula fluxicolor Donelli (1997)
- Russula foeda Reumaux (1996)
- Russula foetens Pers. (1796) – foetid russula
- Russula foetentoides Razaq, Khalid & Niazi (2014)
- Russula foetentula Peck (1907)
- Russula foetida C. Martín (1894)
- Russula foetulenta Buyck (1990)
- Russula fontqueri Singer (1947)
- Russula formosa Kučera (1930)
- Russula fortunae Corrales (2019)
- Russula fosteriana Murrill (1943)
- Russula fragaria Kudřna (1919)
- Russula fragaricolor Carteret & Reumaux (1999)
- Russula fragilis Fr. (1838) (Note: Persoon is often given first authorship, but his Agaricus fragilis was already used by August Batsch in his 1789 Elenchus Fungorum.) – fragile brittlegill
- Russula fragilissima R. Heim (1943)
- Russula fragiloides Murrill (1946)
- Russula fragrans Romagn. (1954)
- Russula fragrantissima Romagn. (1967)
- Russula frondosae J. Blum ex Reumaux (1996)
- Russula fucosa Burl. (1924)
- Russula fuegiana Singer (1950)
- Russula fuegiana Singer (1950)
- Russula fujianensis N.K. Zeng, Y.X. Han & Zhi Q. Liang (2023)
- Russula fuliginosa Sarnari (1993)
- Russula fulvescens Burl. (1915)
- Russula fulvispora (A.H. Sm.) Trappe & T.F. Elliott (2018)
- Russula fulvograminea Ruots., Sarnari & Vauras (1997)
- Russula fulvoochrascens Buyck (1990)
- Russula furcata Pers. (1796)
- Russula furcatifolia Murrill (1943)
- Russula furcatispina (T. Lebel) T. Lebel (2017)
- Russula fuscescens Velen. (1920)
- Russula fuscodiscoidea Pidlich-Aigner (2014)
- Russula fuscogrisea Petch (1922)
- Russula fuscolilacea Velen. (1920)
- Russula fusconigra M.M. Moser (1979)
- Russula fuscoochracea Velen. (1920)
- Russula fuscorosea J. Blum ex Bon (1986)
- Russula fuscorubroides Bon (1976)
- Russula fuscoviolacea (Singer & A.H. Sm.) Trappe & T.F. Elliott (2018)
- Russula fusiformata Yu Song (2022)

=== G–H ===
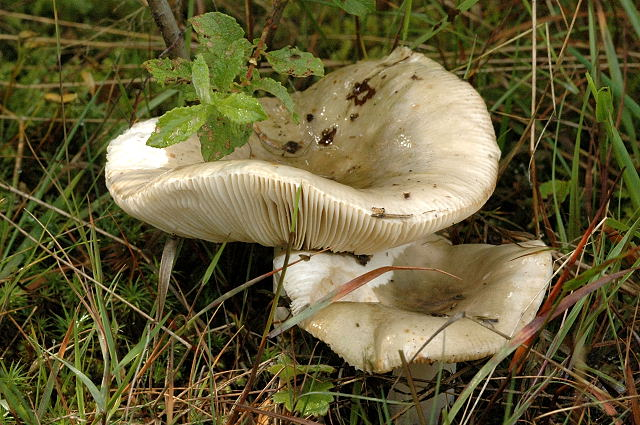
Russula grisea(Batsch 1786) Zawadski 1835

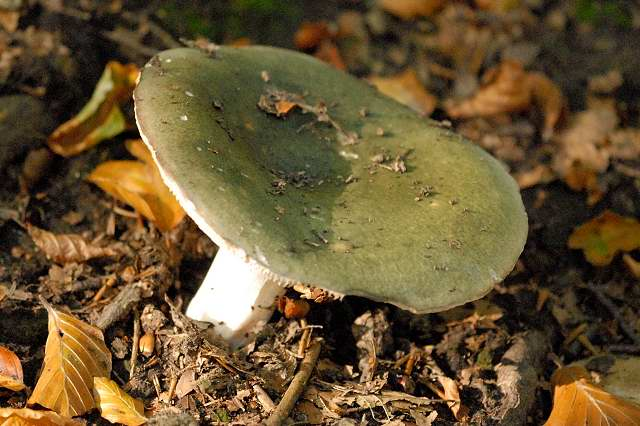
Russula heterophylla (Fr. 1821) Fr. 1838

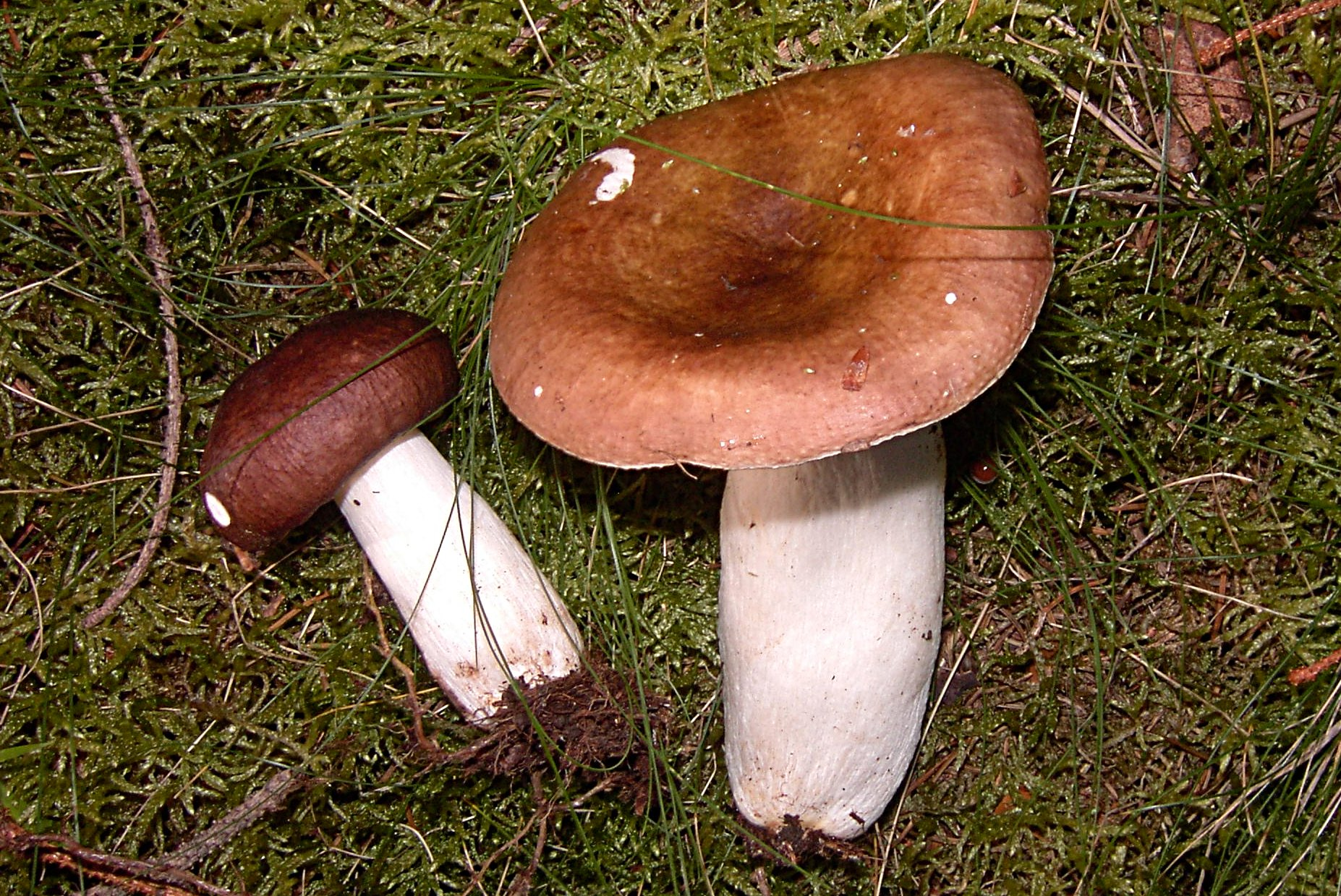
Russula integra (L. 1753) Fr. 1838

- Russula galactea Bidaud & Heullant (1996)
- Russula galbana T. Lebel (2007)
- Russula galileensis (M.M. Moser, Binyam. & Aviz.-Hersh.) Trappe & T.F. Elliott (2018)
- Russula galochroides Sarnari (1988)
- Russula gamundiae (Nouhra & Trierv.-Per.) Trappe & T.F. Elliott (2018)
- Russula gaoligongensis R.L. Zhao, B. Cao & S.Hui Wang (2025)
- Russula garyensis Avis & Barajas (2019)
- Russula gedehensis Henn. (1899)
- Russula gelatinascens Singer (1989)
- Russula gelatinivelata S.L. Mill., Aime & T.W. Henkel (2013)
- Russula gelatinosa Yu Song & L.H. Qiu (2018)
- Russula gemmata Looney (2019)
- Russula gibbosa R. Socha (2011)
- Russula gigantea Jurkeit & Grauw. (2024)
- Russula gigasperma Romagn. (1967)
- Russula gilkeyae (Zeller & C.W. Dodge) Trappe & T.F. Elliott (2018)
- Russula gilva Zvára (1928)
- Russula gilvescens Romagn. ex Bon (1987)
- Russula giselae J.Aug. Schmitt (2022)
- Russula glarea (T. Lebel) T. Lebel (2017)
- Russula glaucescentipes Murrill (1943)
- Russula glutinosa Fatto (1999)
- Russula glutinosoides Buyck & X.H. Wang (2020)
- Russula gnathangensis K. Das, Hembrom & Buyck (2018)
- Russula gomezii Singer (1989)
- Russula goossensiae Beeli (1928)
- Russula gossypina Buyck (1999)
- Russula gracilis Burl. (1915)
- Russula gracillima Jul. Schäff. (1931) – slender brittlegill
- Russula graminea Ruots., H.-G. Unger & Vauras (2012)
- Russula grandihyphata (Nouhra & Trierv.-Per.) Trappe & T.F. Elliott (2018)
- Russula granulata Peck (1901)
- Russula granulosula Murrill (1943)
- Russula grata Britzelm. (1893) – bitter almond brittlegill
- Russula graveolens Romell (1885)
- Russula grisea (Batsch 1786) Zawadski (1835)
- Russula griseobrunnea McNabb (1973)
- Russula griseocarnosa X.H. Wang, Zhu L. Yang & Knudsen (2009)
- Russula griseocephala Buyck (1990)
- Russula griseoincarnata Herp. (1912)
- Russula griseorosea Yu Song (2024)
- Russula griseostipitata McNabb (1973)
- Russula griseoviolacea McNabb (1973)
- Russula griseoviridis McNabb (1973)
- Russula groenlandica Ruots. & Vauras (1994)
- Russula grossa Berk. (1851)
- Russula grundii Thiers (1997)
- Russula guangdongensis Z.S. Bi & T.H. Li (1986)
- Russula guangxiensis G.J. Li, H.A. Wen & R.L. Zhao (2015)
- Russula guayarensis Singer (1983)
- Russula guilinensis R.L. Zhao, B. Cao & S.Hui Wang (2025)
- Russula guttispora Jurkeit (2024)
- Russula guzmanii Trappe & T.F. Elliott (2018)
- Russula haasii Raithelh. (1977)
- Russula haematina G.J. Li & Chun Y. Deng (2024)
- Russula hainanensis N.K. Zeng, Y.X. Han & Zhi Q. Liang (2022)
- Russula hakkae G.J. Li, H.A. Wen & R.L. Zhao (2015)
- Russula handelii Singer (1935)
- Russula harknessii Trappe & T.F. Elliott (2018)
- Russula harkoneniana Buyck (2003)
- Russula heilongjiangensis G.J. Li & R.L. Zhao (2018)
- Russula heinemannii Buyck (1990)
- Russula helgae Romagn. (1985)
- Russula heliochroma R. Heim (1938)
- Russula helios Malençon ex Sarnari (1986)
- Russula helodes Melzer (1929)
- Russula henningsii Sacc. & P. Syd. (1902)
- Russula herrerae A. Kong, A. Montoya & Estrada (2002)
- Russula heterochroa Kühner (1975)
- Russula heteropellis Jurkeit, E. Ludw. & Quecke (2024)
- Russula heterophylla (Fr.) Fr. (1838) – greasy green brittlegill
- Russula heterospora Beardslee (1934)
- Russula heterosporoides Murrill (1945)
- Russula heterotricha L.C. Monedero (2013)
- Russula hibbardae Burl. (1921)
- Russula hiemisilvae Buyck (1993)
- Russula himalayana Rawla & Sarwal (1983)
- Russula himalayensis M. Kaur (2007)
- Russula hixsonii Murrill (1943)
- Russula hobartiae Loizides & J.M. Vidal (2019)
- Russula hoehnelii Singer (1948)
- Russula hongoi Singer (1989)
- Russula hookeri Paloi, A.K. Dutta & K. Acharya (2015)
- Russula hortensis Sarnari (1998)
- Russula horticola Kudřna (1920)
- Russula humboldtii Singer (1963)
- Russula humidicola Burl. (1915)
- Russula hunsuckeri T.F. Elliott & Trappe (2018)
- Russula huotanjun Shu H. Li & X.H. Wang (2023)
- Russula hydrophila Horniček (1958)
- Russula hydropica Buyck (1990)
- Russula hygrophytica Pegler (1980)
- Russula hypofragilis Bazzic., D. Mill. & Buyck (2017)
- Russula hysgina Buyck & E. Horak (1999)

=== I–K ===
- Russula icterina Y.Lu Chen & Jun F. Liang (2024)
- Russula idahoensis (Singer & A.H. Sm.) Trappe & T.F. Elliott (2018)
- Russula idroboi Singer (1963)
- Russula ignipes Reumaux (2017)
- Russula ilicis Romagn., Chevassut & Privat (1972)
- Russula illota Romagn. (1954)
- Russula imitatrix Homola & Shaffer (1975)
- Russula immaculata (Beeli) Dennis (1955)
- Russula inamoena Sarnari (1994)
- Russula incarnaticeps Murrill (1940)
- Russula inconspicua Velen. (1920)
- Russula inconstans Burl. (1936)
- Russula incrassata Buyck (1990)
- Russula indecorata P. Karst. (1904)
- Russula indica Sathe & J.T. Daniel (1981)
- Russula indoalba A. Ghosh, Buyck, Baghela, K. Das & R.P. Bhatt (2016)
- Russula indoarmeniaca A. Ghosh, K. Das & R.P. Bhatt (2016)
- Russula indocatillus A. Ghosh, K. Das & R.P. Bhatt (2019)
- Russula indohimalayana K. Das, I. Bera, A. Ghosh & Buyck (2018)
- Russula indoilicis Altaf, A. Ghosh, K. Verma & Y.P. Sharma (2021)
- Russula indonigra K. Das, A. Ghosh, Buyck & Hembrom (2020)
- Russula indosenecis A. Ghosh, D. Chakr., K. Das & Buyck (2022)
- Russula inedulis Murrill (1945)
- Russula inflata Buyck (1988)
- Russula inflatocystis Jurkeit (2024)
- Russula ingens Buyck (1989)
- Russula ingwa Grgur. (1997)
- Russula innocua (Singer) Romagn. ex Bon (1982)
- Russula inopina Shaffer (1964)
- Russula inornata Buyck & Randrianj. (2022)
- Russula inquinata McNabb (1973)
- Russula insignis Quél. (1888)
- Russula integra (L.) Fr. (1838)
- Russula integriformis Sarnari (1994)
- Russula intermedia P. Karst. (1888)
- Russula intervenosa Paloi, A.K. Dutta & K. Acharya (2016)
- Russula intricata Buyck (1988)
- Russula iodiolens (A.H. Sm. & V.L. Wells) Trappe & T.F. Elliott (2018)
- Russula ionochlora Romagn. (1952) – oilslick brittlegill
- Russula iqbalii Naveed, Ijaz, S. Ullah & Jabeen (2024)
- Russula iterika Grgur. (1997)
- Russula japonica Hongo (1954)
- Russula jaroslavii Reumaux & Frund (2017)
- Russula javanica Sacc. & P. Syd. (1902)
- Russula jilinensis G.J. Li & H.A. Wen (2012)
- Russula joannis Bon (1986)
- Russula josserandii Bertault (1977)
- Russula junzifengensis S. Liu & J. Zhi Qiu (2024)
- Russula kalimna Grgur. (1997)
- Russula kanadii A.K. Dutta & K. Acharya (2015)
- Russula kangchenjungae Van de Putte, K. Das & Buyck (2010)
- Russula kansaiensis Hongo (1979)
- Russula kashmirana Khurshid & Naseer (2022)
- Russula katarinae Adamčík & Buyck (2015)
- Russula kathmanduensis Adhikari (1999)
- Russula kauffmaniana (Singer) Singer (1940)
- Russula kavinae Melzer & Zvára (1928)
- Russula kellyi Burl. (1924)
- Russula kermesina T. Lebel (2007)
- Russula kewzingensis K. Das, D. Chakr. & Buyck (2017)
- Russula khinganensis G.J. Li & R.L. Zhao (2018)
- Russula kivuensis Buyck (1988)
- Russula koleggiensis K. Das, S.L. Mill., J.R. Sharma & J. Hemenway (2008)
- Russula korystospora T. Lebel (2017)
- Russula krjukowensis (Bucholtz) Trappe & T.F. Elliott (2018)

=== L ===
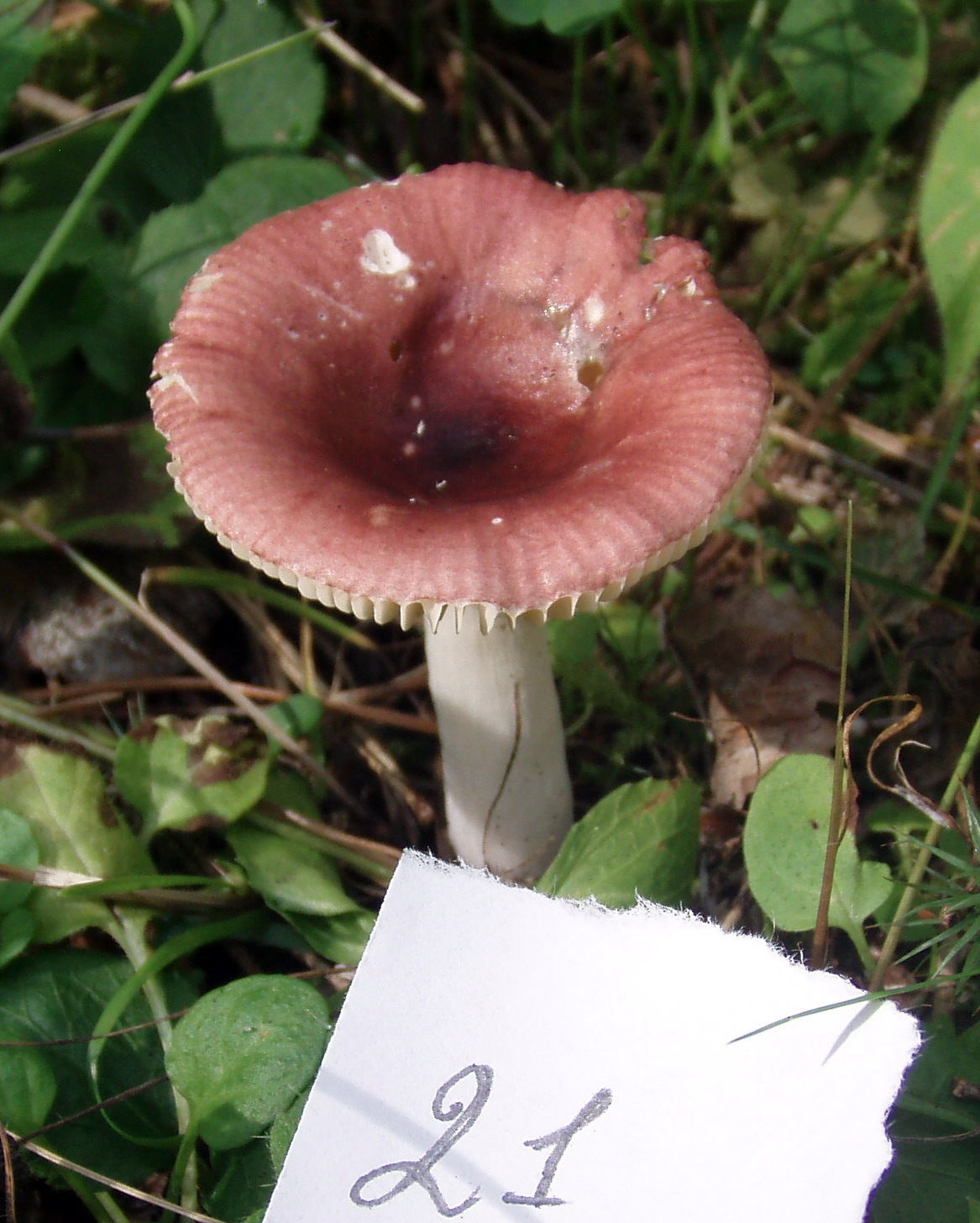
Russula laricina Velen. 1920

- Russula laccata Huijsman (1955)
- Russula lacteocarpa Yu Song (2023)
- Russula laeta Jul. Schäff. (1952)
- Russula laevis Kälviäinen, Ruots. & Taipale (2019)
- Russula lakhanpalii A. Ghosh, K. Das & R.P. Bhatt (2019)
- Russula lamprocystidiata Buyck (1989)
- Russula langei Bon (1970)
- Russula languida Čern. & H. Raab (1955)
- Russula lapponica H. Kaufm. & Weholt (2024)
- Russula laricina Velen. (1920)
- Russula laricinoaffinis Bon (1988)
- Russula lateralipes Buyck & E. Horak (1999)
- Russula lateritia Quél. (1886)
- Russula lateriticola (R. Heim) Singer (1942)
- Russula latolamellata Y. Song & L.H. Qiu (2020)
- Russula lauradomingueziae Trappe & T.F. Elliott (2018)
- Russula lavandula Y.Lu Chen, Bin Chen & Jun F. Liang (2024)
- Russula leelavathyi K.B. Vrinda, C.K. Pradeep & T.K. Abraham (1997)
- Russula leguminosarum Singer (1983)
- Russula lenkunya Grgur. (1997)
- Russula lentiginosa Buyck & D. Mitch. (2003)
- Russula leonardii T. Lebel (2017)
- Russula lepidicolor Romagn. (1962)
- Russula lepidiformis Murrill (1938)
- Russula lepidissima Reumaux & Frund (2011)
- Russula leucobrunnea Yu Song (2023)
- Russula leucocarpa (T. Lebel) T. Lebel (2017)
- Russula leucomarginata Bin Chen, Jun F. Liang & X.M. Jiang (2022)
- Russula leucomodesta Singer (1958)
- Russula leucospora Bon (1986)
- Russula leucoxantha Fr. (1815)
- Russula levispora Murrill (1943)
- Russula levisporiformis Murrill (1946)
- Russula levyana Murrill (1945)
- Russula lewisii Buyck (2004)
- Russula liberiensis Singer (1948)
- Russula lilacea Quél. (1877)
- Russula lilaceofusca Y.Lu Chen & Jun F. Liang (2024)
- Russula lilacina (A.H. Sm.) Trappe & T.F. Elliott (2022)
- Russula lilacinocremea Romagn. ex Bidaud, Moënne-Locc. & Reumaux (1996)
- Russula lilacipes Shear (1939)
- Russula lilliputia S.L. Mill., Aime & T.W. Henkel (2024)
- Russula littoralis Romagn. (1972)
- Russula littorea Pennycook (2003)
- Russula livescens (Batsch) Bataille (1908)
- Russula lividirosea Murrill (1940)
- Russula lividopallescens Sarnari (2001)
- Russula liyui C.Y. Niu, T.Z. Liu & G.J. Li (2024)
- Russula longicollis Y.Lu Chen & Jun F. Liang (2023)
- Russula longipes (Singer) Moënne-Locc. & Reumaux (2003)
- Russula longispora (T. Lebel) T. Lebel (2017)
- Russula longisterigmata (Nouhra & Trierv.-Per.) Trappe & T.F. Elliott (2018)
- Russula lotus Fang Li (2018)
- Russula ludoviciana Shaffer (1989)
- Russula luofuensis B. Chen & J.F. Liang (2021)
- Russula lurida Pers. (1796)
- Russula luteirosea (Bougher) T. Lebel (2017)
- Russula luteispora Murrill (1945)
- Russula lutensis Romagn. (1940)
- Russula luteoalba Britzelm. (1896)
- Russula luteoaurantia Romagn. ex Bon (1982)
- Russula luteobasis Peck (1904)
- Russula luteobrunnea (T. Lebel) T. Lebel (2017)
- Russula luteofolia Fatto (2002)
- Russula luteola (Harkn.) Trappe & T.F. Elliott (2018)
- Russula luteolamellata C.L. Hou, Hao Zhou & G.Q. Cheng (2022)
- Russula luteoloalba Britzelm. (1895)
- Russula luteomaculata Buyck (1989)
- Russula luteonana Pobkwamsuk & Wisitr. (2022)
- Russula luteopulverulenta Beeli (1928)
- Russula luteotacta Rea (1922)
- Russula luteoviolacea Krombh. (1845)
- Russula luteoviridans C. Martín (1894)
- Russula lutescens C.Y. Niu, T.Z. Liu & G.J. Li (2024)
- Russula lutescentifolia Murrill (1946)
- Russula lymanensis (Cázares & Trappe) Trappe & T.F. Elliott (2018)

=== M ===
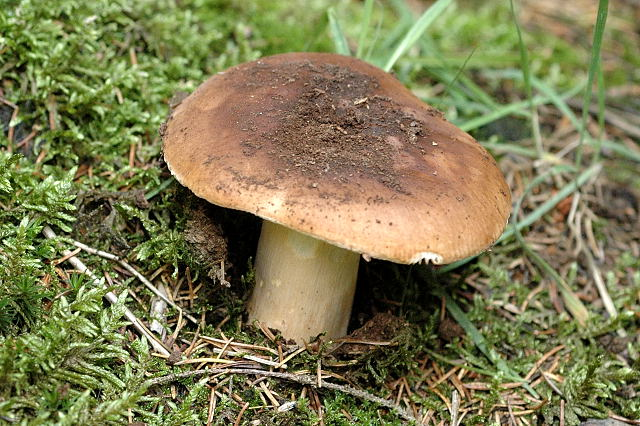
Russula mustelina Fr. 1838

- Russula macrocarpa Jurkeit, Grauw. & J. Albers (2012)
- Russula macrocystidia (T. Lebel) T. Lebel (2017)
- Russula macrocystidiata McNabb (1973)
- Russula macrocystis (R. Heim) Buyck (1989)
- Russula macropoda Singer (1940)
- Russula maculata Quél. (1878)
- Russula maculosa Murrill (1943)
- Russula madagascariensis R. Heim (1938)
- Russula madrensis A. Kong & Buyck (2019)
- Russula maesta Kučera (1931)
- Russula magica Manz & F. Hampe (2021)
- Russula magna Beardslee (1918)
- Russula magnifica Peck (1903)
- Russula maguanensis J. Wang, X.H. Wang, Buyck & T. Bau (2019)
- Russula major Singer (1954)
- Russula mallophora Singer (1950)
- Russula mansehraensis Saba, Caboň & Adamčík (2018)
- Russula marangania Grgur. (1997)
- Russula marginata Burl. (1936)
- Russula mariae Peck (1872)
- Russula marronina Pegler (1980)
- Russula marshalliorum T.F. Elliott & Trappe (2018)
- Russula martinica Pegler (1980)
- Russula marxmuelleriana De Lange, Girwert & F. Hampe (2023)
- Russula matoubensis Pegler (1980)
- Russula mattiroloana (Cavara) T. Lebel (2017)
- Russula mattsmithii Trappe & T.F. Elliott (2018)
- Russula maxima Burl. (1915)
- Russula maximispora J. Blum ex Bon (1986)
- Russula mayawatiana K. Das, S.L. Mill. & J.R. Sharma (2006)
- Russula mediterranea (G. Moreno, R. Galán & Montecchi) Trappe & T.F. Elliott (2018)
- Russula mediterraneensis Konstantinidis, J.M. Vidal, Gelardi, Papadimitriou, Tulli, Angeli & Vizzini (2019)
- Russula medlockii (Trappe & Castellano) Trappe & T.F. Elliott (2018)
- Russula medullata Romagn. (1997)
- Russula megapseudocystidiata X.Y. Sang & L. Fan (2016)
- Russula megaspora (Rodway) T. Lebel (2017)
- Russula meleagris Buyck (1988)
- Russula melitodes Romagn. (1943)
- Russula melliolens Quél. (1898)
- Russula melzeri Zvára (1927)
- Russula melzeriana (Singer) Reumaux & Frund (2011)
- Russula memnon Krombh. (1845)
- Russula mendocinensis Thiers (1997)
- Russula mephitica Pegler (1980)
- Russula meridionalis (Calonge, Mor.-Arr. & J. Gómez) J.M. Vidal, Moreno-Arroyo & A. Paz (2019)
- Russula messapica Sarnari (1989)
- Russula messapicoides (Llistos. & J.M. Vidal) Trappe & T.F. Elliott (2018)
- Russula metachromatica Singer (1952)
- Russula mexicana Burl. (1911)
- Russula micangshanensis Yu Song (2024)
- Russula michiganensis Shaffer (1962)
- Russula microspora Singer (1940)
- Russula mimetica R. Heim (1970)
- Russula miniata McNabb (1973)
- Russula minirosea Yu Song (2024)
- Russula minor Y. Song & L.H. Qiu (2021)
- Russula minutula Velen. (1920)
- Russula mistiformis (Mattir.) Trappe & T.F. Elliott (2018)
- Russula mitis W.G. Sm. (1922)
- Russula mitissima Singer (1989)
- Russula mixta R. Socha (2011)
- Russula miyunensis C.L. Hou, Hao Zhou & G.Q. Cheng (2022)
- Russula modesta Peck (1907)
- Russula mollis Quél. (1883)
- Russula monospora (Boud. & Pat.) Trappe & T.F. Elliott (2018)
- Russula monspeliensis Sarnari (1987)
- Russula montana Shaffer (1975)
- Russula montensis Bidaud, Moënne-Locc. & P.-A. Moreau (1996)
- Russula monticola (Harkn.) Trappe & T.F. Elliott (2018)
- Russula montivaga Singer (1950)
- Russula moravica Velen. (1920)
- Russula mordax Burl. (1936)
- Russula moyersoenii Buyck (1990)
- Russula mukdahanensis Somrith., Sommai, Lueangjar. & Pinruan (2024)
- Russula mukteshwarica K. Das, S.L. Mill., J.R. Sharma & R.P. Bhatt (2006)
- Russula multicolor J. Blum ex Bon (1986)
- Russula multicystidiata McNabb (1973)
- Russula multifurcata Velen. (1920)
- Russula multilamellula B. Chen & J.F. Liang (2021)
- Russula multiseptata G.M. Jansen & Wisman (2024)
- Russula murina Burl. (1936)
- Russula murinacea R. Heim (1938)
- Russula murrillii Burl. (1913)
- Russula mussooriensis Rawla & Sarwal (1983)
- Russula mustelina Fr. (1838) – russet brittlegill
- Russula mustelinicolor Reumaux, Moënne-Locc. & Bidaud (1999)
- Russula mutabilis Murrill (1940)
- Russula mutantipes Murrill (1946)
- Russula myrmecobroma S.L. Mill., Aime & T.W. Henkel (2013)

=== N–O ===
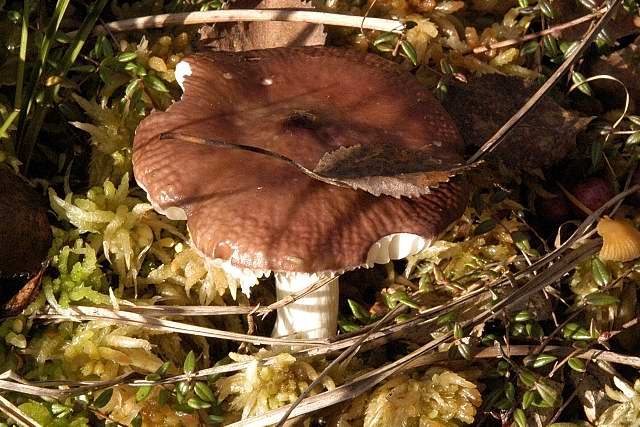
Russula nitida (Pers. 1801) Fr. 1838

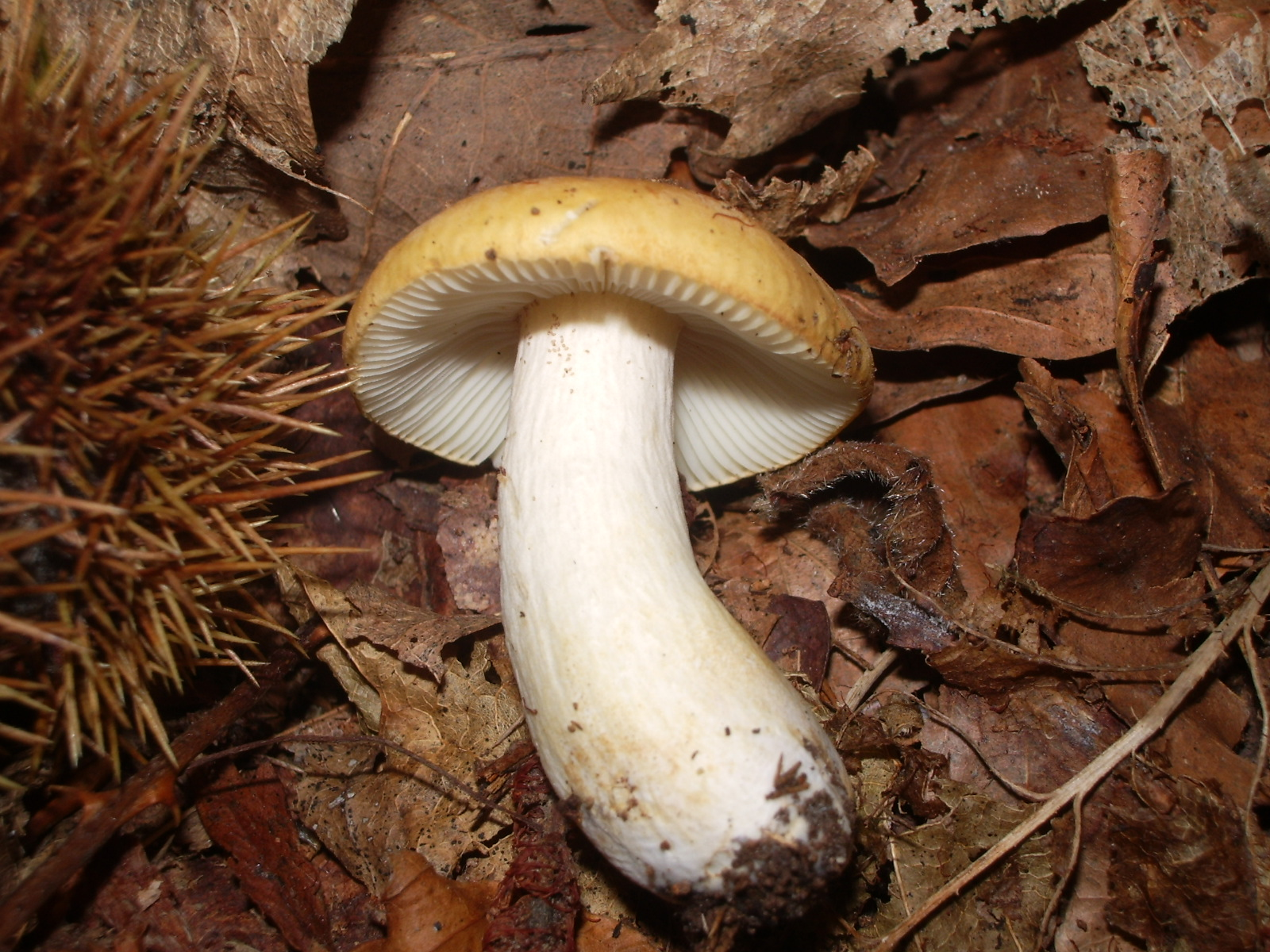
Russula ochroleuca Pers. 1796

- Russula nana Killerm. (1939)
- Russula nancyweberae Trappe & T.F. Elliott (2018)
- Russula nanella Singer (1983)
- Russula nanjingensis (B. Liu & K. Tao) Trappe & T.F. Elliott (2018)
- Russula narcotica P. Kumm. (1871)
- Russula natarajanii K. Das, J.R. Sharma & Atri (2006)
- Russula nausea Pidlich-Aigner (2014)
- Russula nauseosa (Pers.) Fr. (1838)
- Russula neerimea Grgur. (1997)
- Russula neglecta Singer (1947)
- Russula neodiscopoda Singer (1983)
- Russula neoelpidensis S.L. Mill. & Cotter (2025)
- Russula neoemetica Hongo (1979)
- Russula neopascua Noffsinger & C.L. Cripps (2024)
- Russula nepalensis Adhikari (1990)
- Russula netrabaricus K. Das, S.L. Mill., J.R. Sharma & J. Hemenway (2008)
- Russula neuhoffii (Soehner) J.M. Vidal (2019)
- Russula nigrescentipes Peck (1906)
- Russula nigrifacta De Lange & Adamčík (2021)
- Russula nigrocarpa S.Y. Zhou, Y. Song & L.H. Qiu (2020)
- Russula nigrodisca Peck (1889)
- Russula nigropurpurea Bidaud & Moënne-Locc. (1997)
- Russula nigroviolacea Buyck (1989)
- Russula nigrovirens Q. Zhao, Yang K. Li & J.F. Liang (2014)
- Russula niigatensis Hongo (1955)
- Russula nitida (Pers.) Fr. (1838)
- Russula nivalis Fang Li (2018)
- Russula niveopicta N.K. Zeng, Y.X. Han & Zhi Q. Liang (2023)
- Russula nkayambae Buyck (2005)
- Russula nobilis Velen. (1920) – beechwood sickener
- Russula nondistincta (Trappe & Castellano) Trappe & T.F. Elliott (2018)
- Russula nondorbingi Singer (1958)
- Russula nothofagi (E. Horak) Trappe & T.F. Elliott (2018)
- Russula nothofaginea Singer (1950)
- Russula novae-zelandiae McNabb (1973)
- Russula novispora Murrill (1944)
- Russula nuda M. Shimizu & Tonouchi (2025)
- Russula nuoljae Kühner (1975)
- Russula nuragica Sarnari (1986)
- Russula nympharum F. Hampe & Marxm. (2016)
- Russula obscuricolor K. Das, A. Ghosh & Buyck (2017)
- Russula obscuriformis Murrill (1945)
- Russula obscurozelleri Bazzic., D. Mill. & Buyck (2017)
- Russula obsoleta Kučera (1929)
- Russula obtecta Singer (1940)
- Russula obtusopunctata Buyck (1989)
- Russula ochraceoalba Britzelm. 1896 Britzelm. (1896)
- Russula ochraceofuliginosa Beeli (1928)
- Russula ochraceorivulosa Buyck (1989)
- Russula ochricompacta Bills & O.K. Mill. (1984)
- Russula ochraleucoides Kauffman (1918)
- Russula ochrifloridana Buyck & Adamčík (2010)
- Russula ochrobrunnea S.Y. Zhou, Y. Song & L.H. Qiu (2020)
- Russula ochrocephala Buyck (1989)
- Russula ochroflavescens Reumaux (1996)
- Russula ochroleuca Fr. (1838) – common yellow russula
- Russula ochroleuciformis Murrill (1946)
- Russula ochroleucoides Kauffman (1917)
- Russula ochrophylla Peck (1898)
- Russula ochrosperma Moënne-Locc. (1996)
- Russula ochrostraminea Pegler (1980)
- Russula ochroviridis (Cooke) Sacc. (1891)
- Russula oculata Sanon & Buyck (2014)
- Russula odorata Romagn. (1950)
- Russula odorifera Trappe & T.F. Elliott (2018)
- Russula oinochroa Buyck (1988)
- Russula oleifera Buyck (1990)
- Russula olgae Velen. (1920)
- Russula olida (A.H. Sm.) Trappe & T.F. Elliott (2018)
- Russula olivacea (Schaeff.) Fr. (1838)
- Russula olivaceoflava T. Lebel (2017)
- Russula olivaceohimalayensis A. Ghosh, K. Das & R.P. Bhatt (2019)
- Russula olivaceomalva Reumaux, Moënne-Locc. & Bidaud (1999)
- Russula olivicolor Britzelm. (1891)
- Russula olivina Ruots. & Vauras (1990)
- Russula olivobrunnea Ruots. & Vauras (1994)
- Russula olivoides Pidlich-Aigner (2013)
- Russula olympiana Noffsinger & Buyck (2024)
- Russula ombrophila M.M. Gómez & L.C. Monedero (2011)
- Russula omiensis Hongo (1967)
- Russula omnileuca Sá & Wartchow (2016)
- Russula operta Burl. (1924)
- Russula oraria N.K. Zeng, Y.X. Han & Zhi Q. Liang (2023)
- Russula oreades Sarnari (2001)
- Russula oregonensis (Zeller) Trappe & T.F. Elliott (2018)
- Russula oreina Singer (1938)
- Russula oreomunneae Manz, F. Hampe & Corrales (2021)
- Russula orientipurpurea Wisitr., H. Lee & Y.W. Lim (2020)
- Russula orinocensis Pat. & Gaillard (1888)
- Russula ornaticeps Burl. (1921)
- Russula orsonmilleri Trappe & T.F. Elliott (2018)
- Russula osphranticarpa T. Lebel (2017)

=== P ===
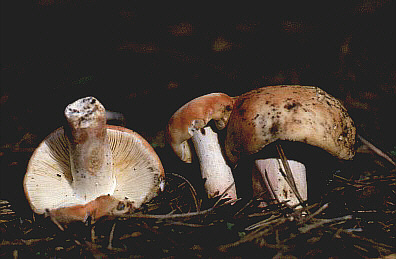
Russula paludosa Britzelm. 1891

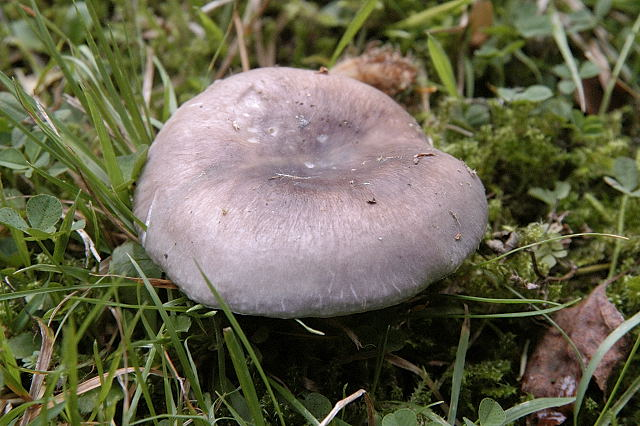
Russula parazurea Jul.Schäff. 1931

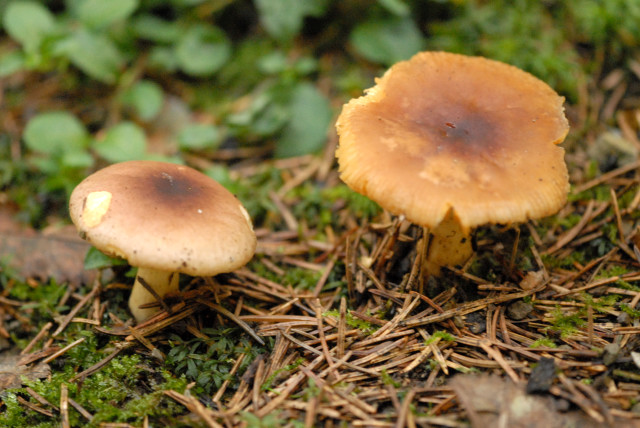
Russula puellaris Fr. 1838

- Russula pachycystis Singer (1983)
- Russula pacifica Thiers (1997)
- Russula pakaraimaeae S.L. Mill. & T.W. Henkel (2024)
- Russula pallescens P. Karst. (1889)
- Russula pallida P. Karst. (1896)
- Russula pallidiflava R. Socha (2011)
- Russula pallidirosea Kropp (2016)
- Russula pallidorimosa Buyck (1990)
- Russula pallidospora J. Blum ex Romagn. (1967)
- Russula pallidula Bin Chen & J.F. Liang (2020)
- Russula paludosa Britzelm. (1891)
- Russula palustris Peck (1901)
- Russula panamae Buyck & Ovrebo (2002)
- Russula paneeroides T. Lebel (2017)
- Russula pannonica Pidlich-Aigner (2014)
- Russula pantherina (Zvára) Moënne-Locc. & Reumaux (1996)
- Russula pantoleuca Singer (1958)
- Russula papakaiensis McNabb (1973)
- Russula papavericolor Reumaux (1996)
- Russula papillata R. Heim & Gilles (1971)
- Russula paradecipiens (A. Favre) A. Favre (1999)
- Russula paraemetica Reumaux (1997)
- Russula paragraveolens S.H. Wang, G.J. Li, R.L. Zhao & B. Cao (2023)
- Russula parahelios D. Antonini & M. Antonini (2002)
- Russula paralepida Reumaux & Frund (2011)
- Russula parapallens Bazzic., D. Mill. & Buyck (2017)
- Russula parasitica (R. Heim) Buyck (1990)
- Russula paravioleipes G.J. Li & W.F. Lin (2021)
- Russula paraxerampelina C.Y. Niu, T.Z. Liu & G.J. Li (2024)
- Russula parazurea Jul. Schäff. (1931)
- Russula parerubescens Reumaux (2011)
- Russula parksii (Singer & A.H. Sm.) Trappe & T.F. Elliott (2018)
- Russula parodorata Sarnari (1999)
- Russula parolivascens Bidaud & Moënne-Locc. (1996)
- Russula partirosea Murrill (1946)
- Russula parva Carteret & Reumaux (2006)
- Russula parvisaxoides (T. Lebel) T. Lebel (2017)
- Russula parvopurpurea Buyck (1990)
- Russula parvorosea Buyck (1990)
- Russula parvovirescens Buyck, D. Mitch. & Parrent (2006)
- Russula parvula Burl. (1915)
- Russula parvulospora Buyck (1989)
- Russula pascua (F.H. Møller & Jul. Schäff.) Kühner (1975)
- Russula patella L.H.D. Zhao & L.P. Zhang (2025)
- Russula patouillardii Singer (1935)
- Russula patriotica Murrill (1948)
- Russula pauli Schulzer (1870)
- Russula pauriensis A. Ghosh, K. Das & Buyck (2017)
- Russula pausiaca Buyck (1987)
- Russula paxilliformis S.L. Mill., Aime & T.W. Henkel (2013)
- Russula paxilloides Earle (1902)
- Russula peckii Singer (1943)
- Russula pectinata Fr. (1838)
- Russula pectinatoides Peck (1907)
- Russula pelargonia Niolle (1941)
- Russula perelegans Buyck & E. Horak (1999)
- Russula periglypta Berk. & Broome (1871)
- Russula perincarnata Reumaux & Frund (2011)
- Russula perlactea Murrill (1943)
- Russula perneglecta Reumaux & Frund (2011)
- Russula perplexa Burl. (1918)
- Russula persanguinea Cleland (1933)
- Russula persicina Krombh. (1845)
- Russula persobria Kauffman ex Singer (1939)
- Russula personata Carteret & Reumaux (2010)
- Russula pervirginea Murrill (1946)
- Russula perviridis Y.Lu Chen, Bin Chen & Jun F. Liang (2024)
- Russula petaloidea Pei Zhang, X.H. Wang & J.R. Lu (2025)
- Russula petersenii A. Ghosh & K. Das (2017)
- Russula phaeocephala Buyck (1989)
- Russula phloginea J. Song & J.F. Liang (2019)
- Russula phoenix Kučera (1930)
- Russula photinia G.J. Li, T.Z. Liu & T.Z. Wei (2023)
- Russula phymatodispora (G.W. Beaton, Pegler & T.W.K. Young) T. Lebel (2017)
- Russula picearum Singer (1962)
- Russula picrea Sarnari (1992)
- Russula picrophylla De Lange & Kleine (2023)
- Russula pila (Pat.) Trappe & T.F. Elliott (2018)
- Russula pilatii Zvára (1933)
- Russula pilocystidiata McNabb (1973)
- Russula pilosa (Zeller & C.W. Dodge) Trappe & T.F. Elliott (2018)
- Russula pilosella T. Lebel (2007)
- Russula pineti (Singer) Trappe & T.F. Elliott (2018)
- Russula pinetorum Murrill (1939)
- Russula piniamans Trappe & T.F. Elliott (2018)
- Russula pinicola Murrill (1943)
- Russula pinophila Murrill (1945)
- Russula piperata Velen. (1920)
- Russula pisiglarea (T. Lebel) T. Lebel (2017)
- Russula placita Burl. (1936)
- Russula plana C.L. Hou, Hao Zhou & G.Q. Cheng (2022)
- Russula pleurogena Buyck & E. Horak (1999)
- Russula plumbeobrunnea Jurkeit & Schößler (2010)
- Russula pluteoides Singer (1989)
- Russula pluvialis Singer (1983)
- Russula poetae Reumaux, Moënne-Locc. & Bidaud (1999)
- Russula poichilochroa Sarnari (1990)
- Russula poissonii Bouriquet (1942)
- Russula polonica Steinhaus (1887)
- Russula polychroma Singer ex Hora (1960)
- Russula polycystis Singer (1940)
- Russula polyphylla Peck (1898)
- Russula porphyrocephala Buyck (1989)
- Russula postiana Romell (1911)
- Russula praeclavipes Murrill (1943)
- Russula praecompacta Murrill (1945)
- Russula praeformosa Murrill (1943)
- Russula praefragilis Murrill (1946)
- Russula praepalustris Murrill (1946)
- Russula praerubra Murrill (1943)
- Russula praerubriceps Murrill (1943)
- Russula praetenuis Murrill (1943)
- Russula praetermissa Reumaux (1996)
- Russula praetervisa Sarnari (1998)
- Russula praeumbonata Burl. (1921)
- Russula prasina G.J. Li & R.L. Zhao (2019)
- Russula primaverna Fatto (1999)
- Russula prinophila Sarnari (1988)
- Russula prolifica Buyck (2008)
- Russula pruinata Buyck (1990)
- Russula pruinosa Velen. (1920)
- Russula prunicolor C.Y. Niu, T.Z. Liu & G.J. Li (2024)
- Russula psammophila Singer (1989)
- Russula pseudoaeruginea (Romagn.) Kuyper & Vuure (1985)
- Russula pseudoaffinis Migl. & Nicolaj (1985)
- Russula pseudoamoenicolor A. Ghosh, Buyck, K. Das, Baghela & R.P. Bhatt (2016)
- Russula pseudoareolata McNabb (1973)
- Russula pseudoaurantiophylla Buyck & V. Hofst. (2017)
- Russula pseudoaurata Jul. Schäff. (1928)
- Russula pseudobubalina J.W. Li & L.H. Qiu (2018)
- Russula pseudocampestris Kühner (1975)
- Russula pseudocarmesina Buyck (1990)
- Russula pseudocarminipes Jurkeit, Karasch & Christan (2024)
- Russula pseudocatillus F. Yuan & Y. Song (2019)
- Russula pseudocavipes Bon (1987)
- Russula pseudochamaeleontina Trendel (2021)
- Russula pseudociliata Buyck (2018)
- Russula pseudocompacta A. Ghosh, K. Das, R.P. Bhatt & Buyck (2017)
- Russula pseudocrustosa G.J. Li & C.Y. Deng (2020)
- Russula pseudocurtipes Jurkeit & Schößler (2024)
- Russula pseudocyanoxantha Paloi, K. Acharya & S. Khatua (2021)
- Russula pseudodelica J.E. Lange (1926)
- Russula pseudodensifolia Paloi, K. Acharya & G. Basak (2025)
- Russula pseudoemetica Secr. ex Singer (1926)
- Russula pseudoepitheliosa Buyck (1990)
- Russula pseudoflavida A. Ghosh, Hembrom, I. Bera & Buyck (2023)
- Russula pseudofoetens Murrill (1945)
- Russula pseudograveolens S.H. Wang, G.J. Li, R.L. Zhao & B. Cao (2023)
- Russula pseudoimpolita Sarnari (1987)
- Russula pseudointegra Arnould & Goris (1907)
- Russula pseudojaponica Y.Lu Chen & Jun F. Liang (2023)
- Russula pseudokrombholzii K. Das, Hembrom, A. Ghosh & Buyck (2018)
- Russula pseudolaeta Sarnari (2005)
- Russula pseudolateriticola Buyck (1999)
- Russula pseudolepida Singer (1940)
- Russula pseudomelitodes J. Blum ex Bon (1986)
- Russula pseudomelliolens Singer ex Reumaux (1996)
- Russula pseudomodesta Paloi, Suwannar. & Kumla (2023)
- Russula pseudo-olivascens Kärcher (2002)
- Russula pseudopeckii Fatto (1998)
- Russula pseudopectinata Henn. (1908)
- Russula pseudopectinatoides G.J. Li & H.A. Wen (2015)
- Russula pseudopelargonia Bazzic., D. Mill. & Buyck (2017)
- Russula pseudopuellaris (Bon) Bon (1981)
- Russula pseudopunicea C.L. Hou, Hao Zhou bis & G.Q. Cheng (2023)
- Russula pseudopurpurea Buyck (1990)
- Russula pseudoraoultii Ayel & Bidaud (1996)
- Russula pseudoromellii J. Blum ex Bon (1986)
- Russula pseudorosea J. Blum (1954)
- Russula pseudosenecis A. Ghosh, D. Chakr., K. Das & Buyck (2022)
- Russula pseudosinoparva Hao Zhou bis & C.L. Hou (2023)
- Russula pseudostriatoviridis Buyck (1990)
- Russula pseudosuberetorum Dagron (1998)
- Russula pseudotsugarum Bazzic., D. Mill. & Buyck (2017)
- Russula pseudovesca J.Z. Ying (1989)
- Russula pseudovirescens N. Roy, A.K. Dutta & Tanti (2025)
- Russula pterosperma (T. Lebel) T. Lebel (2017)
- Russula pubescens A. Blytt (1905)
- Russula pudica Carteret & Reumaux (2006)
- Russula pudorina McNabb (1973)
- Russula puellaris Fr. (1838)
- Russula puellula Ebbesen, F.H. Møller & Jul. Schäff. (1937)
- Russula pulcherrima Velen. (1920)
- Russula pulchra Burl. (1918)
- Russula pulchralis Britzelm. (1885)
- Russula pulchrisperma Buyck (1989)
- Russula pulverulenta Peck (1902)
- Russula pumicoidea T. Lebel (2007)
- Russula punctata Krombh. (1845)
- Russula punctipes Singer (1935)
- Russula pungens Beardslee (1918)
- Russula punicea W.F. Chiu (1945)
- Russula punjabensis Naseer, Ashfaq, A. Razzaq & Khalid (2024)
- Russula purpurascens Bres. (1929)
- Russula purpurata Crawshay (1930)
- Russula purpureobrunnea Y.Lu Chen, Bin Chen & Jun F. Liang (2024)
- Russula purpureoflava Cleland (1927)
- Russula purpureofusca Kühner (1975)
- Russula purpureogracilis F. Hampe, Looney & Manz (2019)
- Russula purpureolilacina Fayod (1893)
- Russula purpureomaculata Shaffer (1970)
- Russula purpureomarginalis Fang Li & Yu Song (2024)
- Russula purpureomutabilis Buyck (1989)
- Russula purpureonigra Petch (1917)
- Russula purpureo-olivascens Carteret & Reumaux (2006)
- Russula purpureopallescens G.M. Jansen, K. Raangs, Somhorst & Wisman (2024)
- Russula purpureorosea Yu Song (2022)
- Russula purpureotincta McNabb (1973)
- Russula purpureoverrucosa Fang Li (2018)
- Russula purpureovirescens Porcu, Mua, Casula & Sanna (2018)
- Russula purpureoviridis Khams., Lueangjar., Sommai & Pinruan (2022)
- Russula purpureozonata K. Das, A. Ghosh & Buyck (2021)
- Russula purpurina Quél. & Schulzer (1885)
- Russula purpurissata Reumaux (1996)
- Russula pusilla Peck (1898)
- Russula pusilliformis Murrill (1945)
- Russula pusillissima Moënne-Locc. (1996)
- Russula putida Sarnari (1998)
- Russula pyrenaica J. Blum ex Singer (1982)
- Russula pyriodora Ruots. (2011) – Finland
- Russula pyrrhonii Moënne-Locc. & Reumaux (1996)

=== Q–R ===
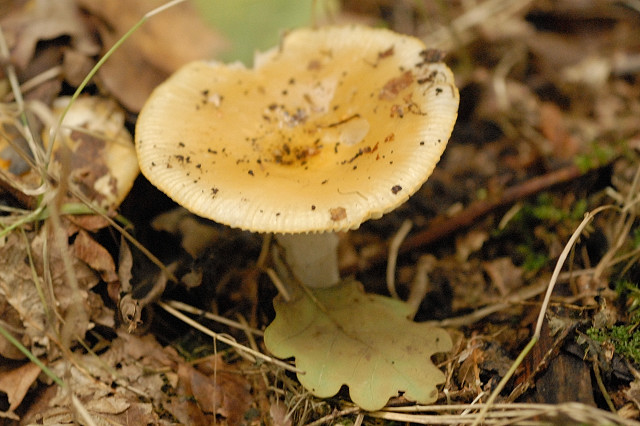
Russula raoultii Quél. 1886

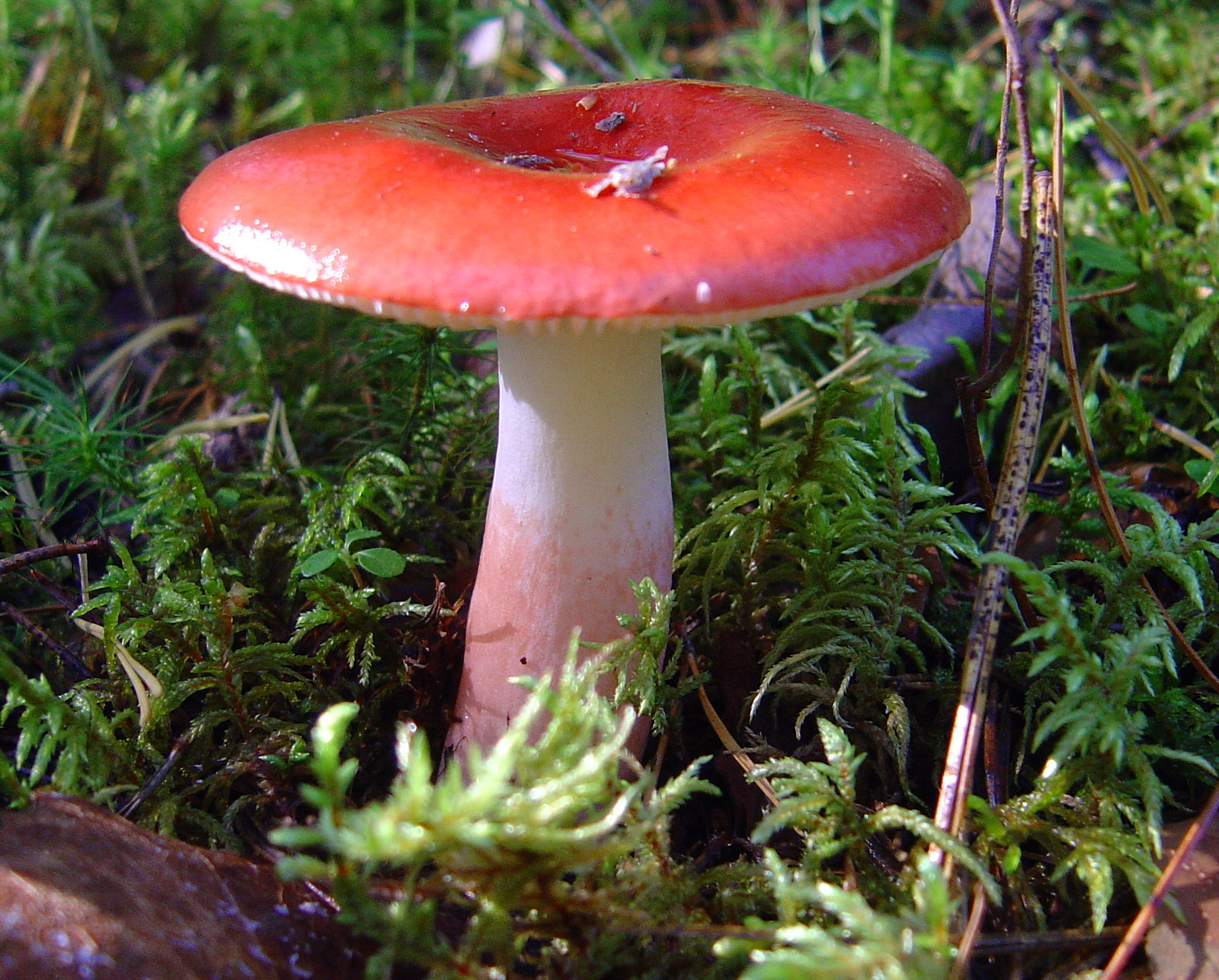
Russula rhodopus Zvára 1927

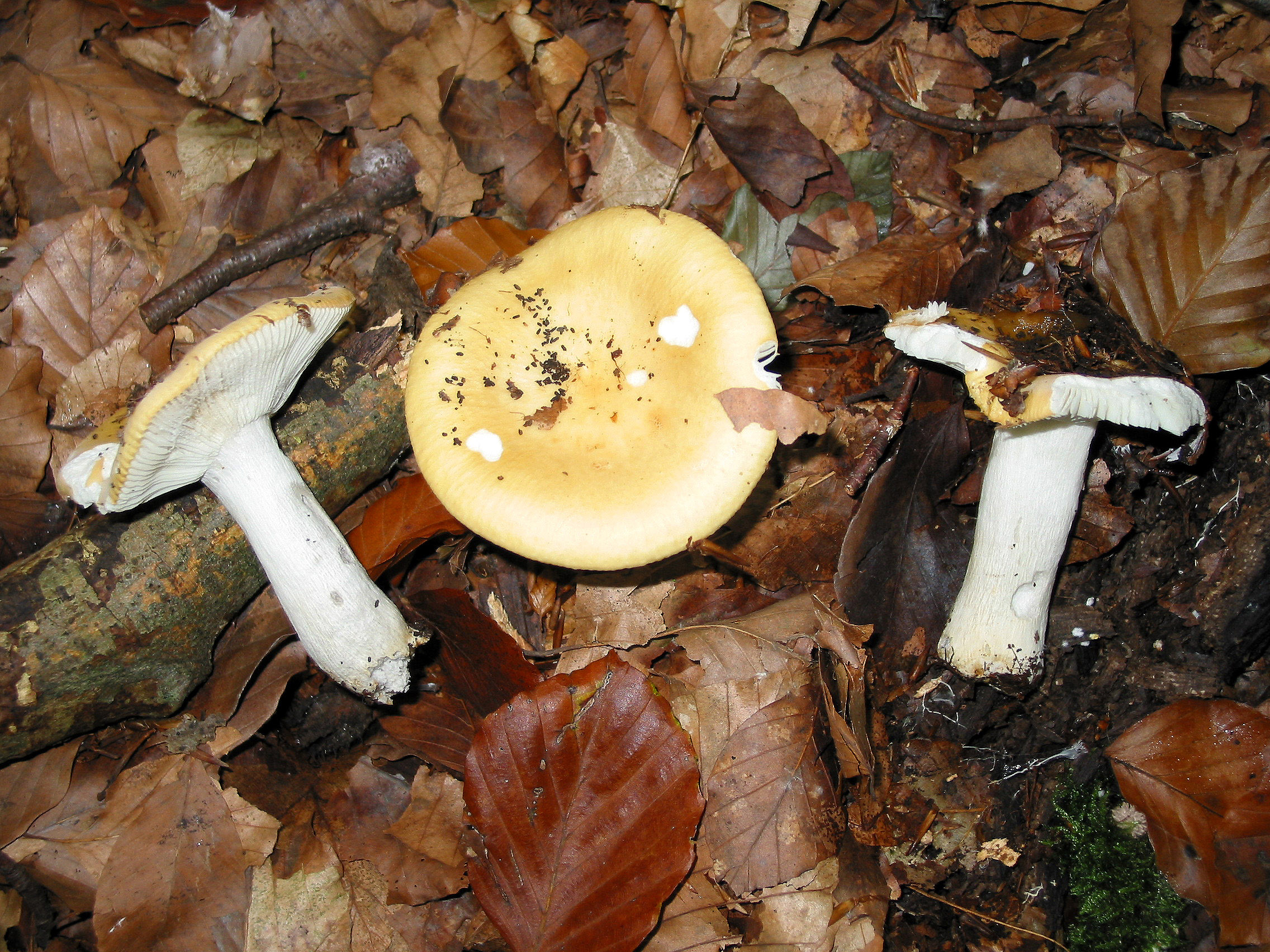
Russula risigallina (Batsch 1786) Sacc. 1915

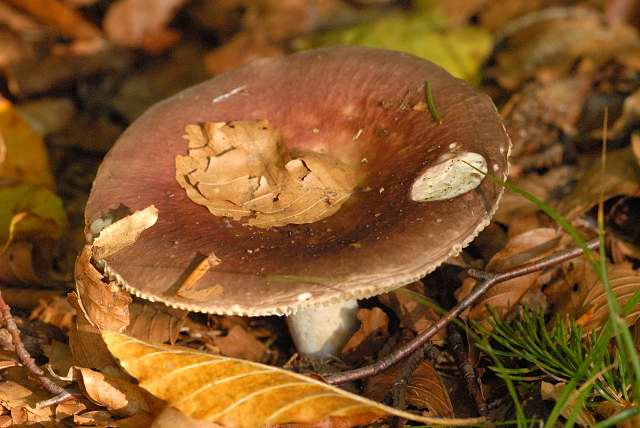
Russula romellii Maire 1910

- Russula queletii Fr. (1872)
- Russula querceti H. Haas & Jul. Schäff. (1952)
- Russula quercetorum Velen. (1920)
- Russula quercicola Razzaq, Shahid, Naseer & Khalid 2023(2023)
- Russula quercilicis Sarnari (1991)
- Russula quercina J.J. Zhou & R.Q. Ji (2022)
- Russula quercophila Buyck & Halling (2004)
- Russula quercus-floribundae M. Kiran & Adamčík (2019)
- Russula quercus-oleoidis Singer (1983)
- Russula quintanensis M. Romero & P. Alvarado (2021)
- Russula radicans R. Heim (1938)
- Russula rajendrae A. Ghosh & K. Das (2017)
- Russula raoultii Quél. (1886)
- Russula recondita Melera & Ostellari (2016)
- Russula reddellii T. Lebel (2007)
- Russula redolens Burl. (1921)
- Russula regalis Murrill (1940)
- Russula reisneri Velen. (1920)
- Russula renidens Ruots., Sarnari & Vauras (1998)
- Russula reticulofolia Yu Song (2023)
- Russula reumauxiana A. Favre (2008)
- Russula rheicolor Looney (2022)
- Russula rhodella E.-J. Gilbert (1932)
- Russula rhodocephala Bazzic., D. Mill. & Buyck (2017)
- Russula rhodochroa G.J. Li & C.Y. Deng (2023)
- Russula rhodomarginata Sarnari (1988)
- Russula rhodomelanea Sarnari (1993)
- Russula rhodopus Zvára (1928)
- Russula rhodoxantha Peyronel (1922)
- Russula rhytipus Fr. (1838)
- Russula rigelliae Velen. (1920)
- Russula rimosa Murrill (1945)
- Russula rimulosa Pennycook (2003)
- Russula riograndensis Singer (1954)
- Russula risigallina (Batsch) Sacc. (1915)
- Russula rivulicola Ruots. & Vauras (2000)
- Russula rivulosa Reumaux (1996)
- Russula robertii J. Blum (1954)
- Russula robinsoniae Burl. (1915)
- Russula robusta R. Heim (1938)
- Russula rodwayi (Massee) T. Lebel (2017)
- Russula rogersii (Singer & A.H. Sm.) Trappe & T.F. Elliott (2018)
- Russula rolfalexii (Trappe, T. Lebel & Castellano) Trappe & T.F. Elliott (2018)
- Russula rolfeana L.D. Gómez & Alfaro (1997)
- Russula romagnesiana Shaffer (1964)
- Russula romagnesii Niolle 1943
- Russula romellii Maire (1910)
- Russula rooseveltiana Murrill (1943)
- Russula rosea Pers. (1796) – rosy russula
- Russula roseicolor J. Blum (1952)
- Russula roseipes Secr. ex Bres. (1883)
- Russula roseitincta Murrill (1940)
- Russula rosella Romell (1912)
- Russula roseoalba Buyck (1988)
- Russula roseoalbescens Reumaux & Frund (2011)
- Russula roseoaurantia Sarnari (1993)
- Russula roseobrunnea J. Blum (1953)
- Russula roseocremea R. Socha, Hálek & Baier (2011)
- Russula roseoisabellina Murrill (1943)
- Russula roseolilacea R. Socha (2011)
- Russula roseomaculata (Singer & A.H. Sm.) Trappe & T.F. Elliott (2018)
- Russula roseonigra Pidlich-Aigner (2015)
- Russula roseopileata McNabb (1973)
- Russula roseostipitata McNabb (1973)
- Russula roseostriata Buyck (1990)
- Russula roseovelata Buyck (1990)
- Russula roseoviolacea Buyck (1990)
- Russula rostraticystidia T. Lebel (2007)
- Russula rubella A. Blytt (1905)
- Russula rubellipes Fatto (1998)
- Russula rubens R. Heim (1938)
- Russula rubescens Beardslee (1914)
- Russula rubida Romagn. ex Reumaux (1996)
- Russula rubiginosus R.Q. Ji, M.L. Xie & J.J. Zhou (2022)
- Russula rubricolor Jabeen, Naseer & Khalid (2020)
- Russula rubrifolia Murrill (1940)
- Russula rubriochracea Murrill (1912)
- Russula rubripurpurea Murrill (1943)
- Russula rubroalba (Singer) Romagn. (1967)
- Russula rubrocarminea Romagn. (1967)
- Russula rubroglutinata S.L. Mill, T.W. Henkel & Aime (2025)
- Russula rubrogrisea (Romagn.) Reumaux (1996)
- Russula rubrolutea (T. Lebel) T. Lebel (2017)
- Russula rubropunctatissima J.L. Cheype & E. Campo (2013)
- Russula rubrorobusta Buyck (2005)
- Russula rubrosquamosa L.P. Tang & S. Jiang (2024)
- Russula rufa G.J. Li & T.Z. Wei (2023)
- Russula rufobasalis Yu Song & L.H. Qiu (2018)
- Russula rugosa Schulzer (1870)
- Russula rugosella Raithelh. (1972)
- Russula rugulosa Peck (1902)
- Russula russuloides (Setch.) Trappe & T.F. Elliott (2018)
- Russula rutila Romagn. (1952)
- Russula ryukokuensis Y. Shimono & T. Kasuya (2021)

=== S ===
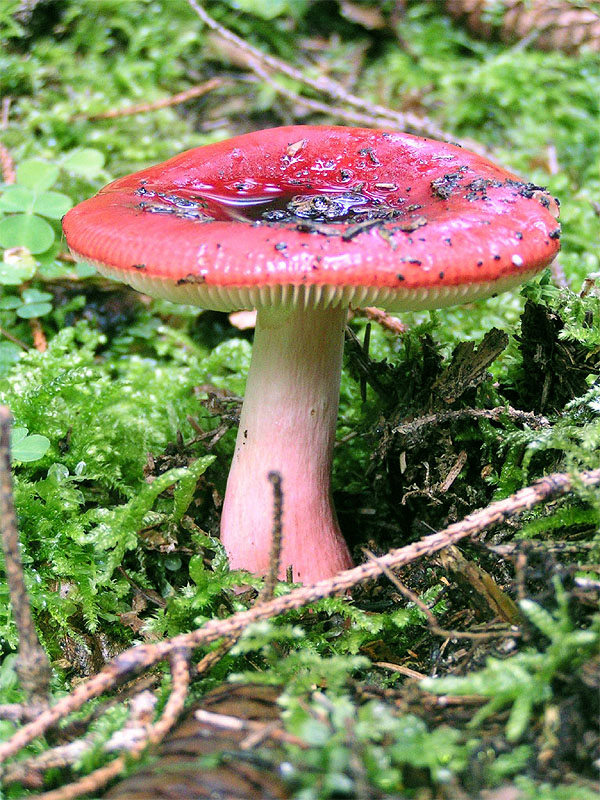
Russula sanguinea (Bull. 1780) Fr. 1838

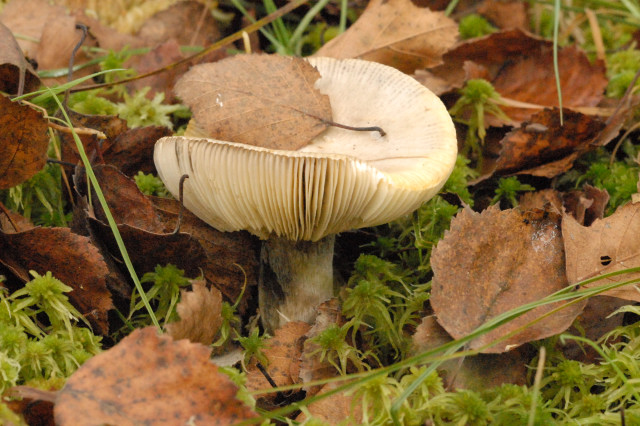
Russula sphagnophila Kauffman 1909

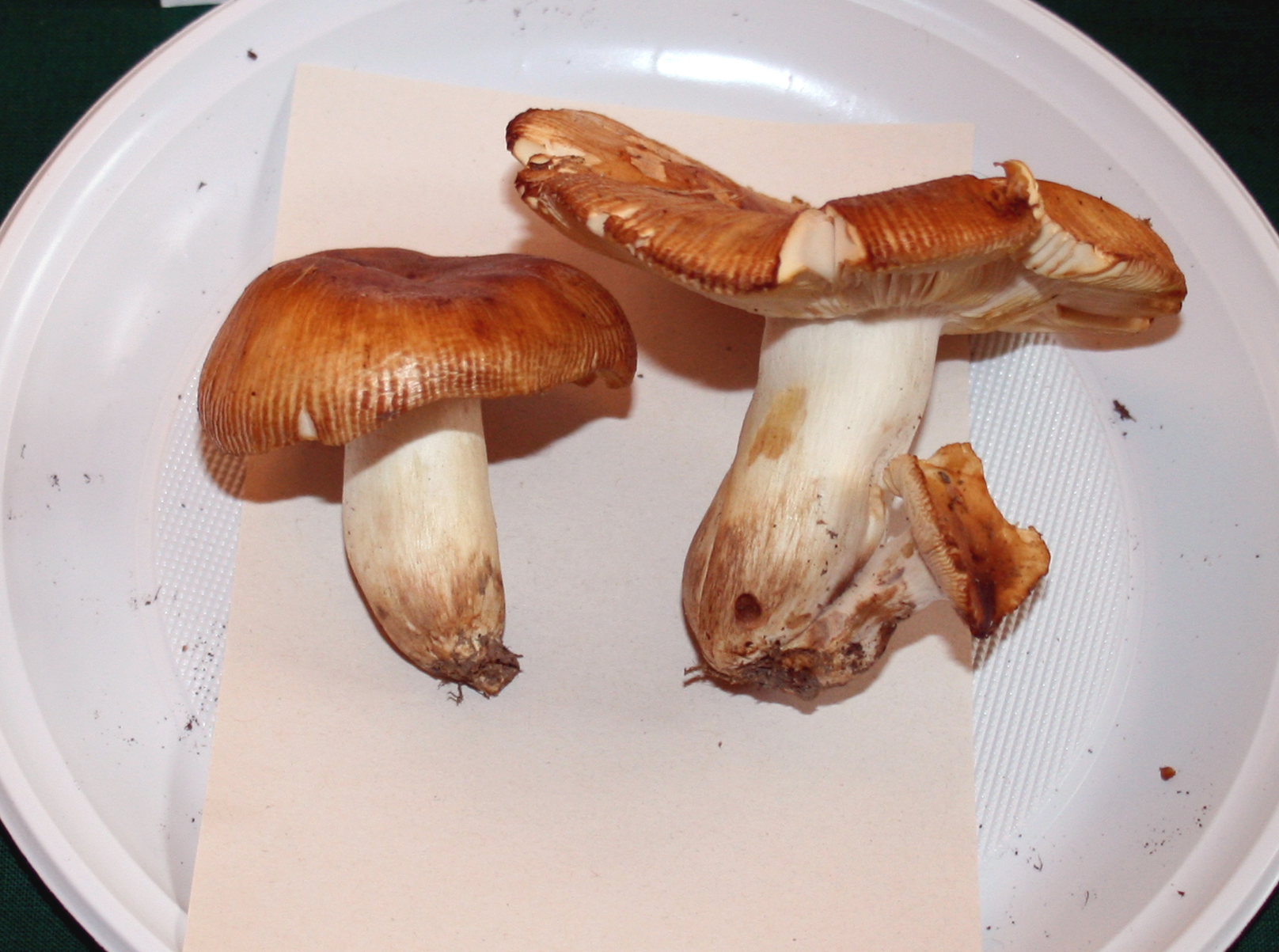
Russula subfoetens W.G.Sm. 1873

- Russula sabulosa R. Heim & J. Blum ex Bon (1986)
- Russula saliceticola (Singer) Kühner ex Knudsen & T. Borgen (1982)
- Russula salishensis Bazzic., D. Mill. & Buyck (2017)
- Russula salmoneolutea Landa & R. Fellner (1986)
- Russula salmonicolor (Romagn.) Reumaux (1996)
- Russula sancti-pauli A. Kong & Buyck (2019)
- Russula sancti-ramonensis L.D. Gómez, Alfaro & Singer (1997)
- Russula sanguinaria (Schumach.) Rauschert (1989) – red russula, bloody brittlegill
- Russula sanguinea Fr. (1838)
- Russula sanguinolenta G.J. Li & Chun Y. Deng (2024)
- Russula sankarae Sanon & Buyck (2014)
- Russula sapinea Sarnari (1994)
- Russula sardonia Fr. (1838)
- Russula sarnarii A. Ghosh, K. Das & R.P. Bhatt (2017)
- Russula scabrella Pei Zhang, X.H. Wang & J.R. Lu (2025)
- Russula scarlatina Trappe & T.F. Elliott (2019)
- Russula schaefferi Kärcher (1996)
- Russula schaefferiana Niolle (1943)
- Russula schaefferina Rawla & Sarwal (1983)
- Russula schizoderma Pat. (1924)
- Russula schoeffelii Čern. & H. Raab (1955)
- Russula scotica A. Pearson (1939)
- Russula sejuncta Buyck (1988)
- Russula semililacea Singer (1989)
- Russula seminuda (Massee & Rodway) T. Lebel (2017)
- Russula senecis S. Imai (1938)
- Russula seperina Dupain (1912)
- Russula septentrionalis Singer (1936)
- Russula sericatula Romagn. (1958)
- Russula sericella Murrill (1945)
- Russula sericeonitens Kauffman (1909)
- Russula serissima Peck (1910)
- Russula serotina Quél. (1879)
- Russula sese Beeli (1928)
- Russula sesemoindu Beeli (1928)
- Russula sesemotani Beeli (1928)
- Russula sesenagula Beeli (1928)
- Russula sessilis (Massee & Rodway) T. Lebel (2017)
- Russula setchelliana (Singer & A.H. Sm.) Trappe & T.F. Elliott (2018)
- Russula setigera (Zeller) Trappe & T.F. Elliott (2018)
- Russula shafferi Trappe & T.F. Elliott (2018)
- Russula shanglaensis S. Ullah, Khalid & Fiaz (2020)
- Russula sharmae K. Das, Atri & Buyck (2013)
- Russula shawarensis Kiran & Khalid (2020)
- Russula shigatseensis S.H. Wang, R.L. Zhao & B. Cao (2023)
- Russula shingbaensis K. Das & S.L. Mill. (2014)
- Russula shoreae D. Chakr., A. Ghosh, K. Das & Buyck (2023)
- Russula shultziae (T. Lebel) T. Lebel (2017)
- Russula siamensis Yomyart, Piap., Watling, Whalley & Sihan. (2006)
- Russula sichuanensis G.J. Li & H.A. Wen (2013)
- Russula siennicolor Krauch, Jurkeit & F. Hampe (2012)
- Russula sierrensis Thiers (1997)
- Russula sikkimensis K. Das, Atri & Buyck (2013)
- Russula silvestris (Singer) Reumaux (1996)
- Russula silvicola Shaffer (1975)
- Russula similaris Trappe & T.F. Elliott (2018)
- Russula similis Bres. (1929)
- Russula simillima Peck (1872)
- Russula simulans Burl. (1921)
- Russula singaporensis Singer (1955)
- Russula singeri R. Heim (1938)
- Russula singularis Jurkeit (2010)
- Russula sinoadusta X.H. Wang, L.H. Huang & Hai J. Li (2023)
- Russula sinoparva C.L. Hou, Hao Zhou & G.Q. Cheng (2022)
- Russula sinorobusta C.L. Hou, Hao Zhou & G.Q. Cheng (2022)
- Russula sinuata T. Lebel (2007)
- Russula sladkyi Velen. (1920)
- Russula smaragdina Quél. (1886)
- Russula smithii Singer (1938)
- Russula solaris Ferd. & Winge (1924)
- Russula solida (Rodway) Trappe & T.F. Elliott (2018)
- Russula solitaria McNabb (1973)
- Russula sordida Peck (1906)
- Russula sororia (Fr.) Romell (1891)
- Russula sororiicolor Singer (1983)
- Russula sparsa (T. Lebel) T. Lebel (2017)
- Russula spataforae Trappe & T.F. Elliott (2018)
- Russula speciosa J. Blum ex Bon (1986)
- Russula spectabilis Manz, F. Hampe & Buyck (2025)
- Russula sphagnetorum Romagn. (1985)
- Russula sphagnicola R. Socha (2011)
- Russula sphagnophila Kauffman (1909)
- Russula spinispora T. Lebel (2017)
- Russula splendens Bidaud, Carteret & Armada (2012)
- Russula spurcata Reumaux & Frund (2011)
- Russula squalida Peck (1907)
- Russula sribuabanensis Paloi, Suwannar. & Kumla (2023)
- Russula stagnorum Carteret & Reumaux (2003)
- Russula stagnosa Reumaux (2003)
- Russula steinbachii Čern. & Singer (1934)
- Russula stenocystidiata (Sarnari) Donelli (2009)
- Russula stenotricha Romagn. (1962)
- Russula stevemilleri Trappe & T.F. Elliott (2018)
- Russula stewartii Trappe & T.F. Elliott (2018)
- Russula stipitata (H.A. Peters) Trappe & T.F. Elliott (2018)
- Russula straminea Malençon (1944)
- Russula straminella G.J. Li & C.Y. Deng (2021)
- Russula striatella Jul. Schäff. (1933)
- Russula striatoviridis Buyck (1990)
- Russula stricklandiorum T.F. Elliott & Trappe (2018)
- Russula stricta Murrill (1912)
- Russula stuntzii Grund (1979)
- Russula suavis Schulzer (1881)
- Russula subabietis Trappe & T.F. Elliott (2018)
- Russula subacris Murrill (1940)
- Russula subaffinis Bidaud & P.-A. Moreau (1996)
- Russula subalbidula Murrill (1941)
- Russula subalpina O.K. Mill. (1982)
- Russula subalpinogrisea K. Das, I. Bera, A. Ghosh & Buyck (2018)
- Russula subalutacea Burl. (1915)
- Russula subarctica I.L. Brunner (1989)
- Russula subatropurpurea J.W. Li & L.H. Qiu (2019)
- Russula subazurea Bon (1975)
- Russula subbrevipes Jun F. Liang & J. Song (2022)
- Russula subbrevis Reumaux (1996)
- Russula subbrunneipes Murrill (1945)
- Russula subbubalina B. Chen & J.F. Liang (2021)
- Russula subcarminea Reumaux (2003)
- Russula subcarnicolor Murrill (1946)
- Russula subclariana Jurkeit (2024)
- Russula subcompacta Britzelm. (1891)
- Russula subcremeiceps Murrill (1946)
- Russula subcristulata Romagn. (1962)
- Russula subcrustosa L.D. Gómez & Singer (1997)
- Russula subcyanoxantha Murrill (1943)
- Russula subdensifolia Murrill (1941)
- Russula subdepallens Peck (1896)
- Russula subemetica Schulzer (1881)
- Russula suberetorum Dagron (1992)
- Russula subfistulosa Buyck (1990)
- Russula subflava Murrill (1941)
- Russula subfloridana Murrill (1946)
- Russula subfoetens W.G. Sm. (1873)
- Russula subfragiliformis Murrill (1943)
- Russula subfragilis Henn. (1899)
- Russula subfulva (Singer & A.H. Sm.) Trappe & T.F. Elliott (2018)
- Russula subfurcata Reumaux (1999)
- Russula subglauca Murrill (1943)
- Russula subgraminicolor Murrill (1943)
- Russula subgranulosa Murrill (1940)
- Russula subincarnata Murrill (1941)
- Russula sublaevis (Buyck) Buyck (1993)
- Russula sublevispora (Romagn.) Kühner & Romagn. (1967)
- Russula subloculata Trappe, T. Lebel & Castellano (2002)
- Russula sublongipes Reumaux ex Reumaux & Moënne-Locc. (1999)
- Russula subluteobasis Murrill (1943)
- Russula submelitodes Jurkeit (2010)
- Russula subminutula Singer (1947)
- Russula subnigricans Hongo (1955)
- Russula subobscura Murrill (1939)
- Russula subochracea (A.H. Sm.) Trappe & T.F. Elliott (2018)
- Russula subochroleuca Murrill (1938)
- Russula subochrophylla Murrill (1938)
- Russula subolivacea (A.H. Sm.) Trappe & T.F. Elliott (2018)
- Russula subpallidipes (Singer) Delgat (2021)
- Russula subpallidirosea J.B. Zhang & L.H. Qiu (2017)
- Russula subpallidospora Marxm. (2025)
- Russula subpavonina Murrill (1946)
- Russula subpectinatoides G.J. Li & Q.B. Sun (2021)
- Russula subpruinosa Murrill (1945)
- Russula subpunctata Kauffman (1918)
- Russula subpunctipes J. Song (2020)
- Russula subpunicea B. Chen & J.F. Liang (2021)
- Russula subpurpurea Reumaux (1999)
- Russula subpusilla Murrill (1941)
- Russula subromellii Jurkeit (2024)
- Russula subrosacea (A.H. Sm.) Trappe & T.F. Elliott (2018)
- Russula subrubens (J.E. Lange) Bon (1972)
- Russula subrubescens Murrill (1940)
- Russula subrutilans Yang K. Li & J.F. Liang (2015)
- Russula subsanguinaria Bin Chen, Jun F. Liang & X.M. Jiang (2022)
- Russula subsericeonitens Murrill (1939)
- Russula subseriflua Buyck (1989)
- Russula subsilvestris Carteret & Reumaux (2003)
- Russula subsmaragdina Reumaux (1996)
- Russula subsordida Peck (1906)
- Russula substriata J. Wang, X.H. Wang, Buyck & T. Bau (2019)
- Russula subsulphurea Murrill (1945)
- Russula subtenuiceps Fatto (2002)
- Russula subterfurcata Romagn. (1967)
- Russula subterranea L. Fan & H.Y. Fu (2025)
- Russula subtilis Burl. (1924)
- Russula subtorulosa Singer (1982)
- Russula subvariata Murrill (1945)
- Russula subvelata Singer (1929)
- Russula subvelutina Peck (1906)
- Russula subversatilis C.L. Hou, Hao Zhou & G.Q. Cheng (2022)
- Russula subveternosa Singer (1940)
- Russula subvinosa McNabb (1973)
- Russula subviridella Murrill (1943)
- Russula subviridescens Buyck (1989)
- Russula succinea G.J. Li & C.Y. Deng (2021)
- Russula suecica Ruots. & Vauras (2016)
- Russula sulcatipes Murrill (1912)
- Russula sulphurea Velen. (1920)
- Russula syringina (Zvára) Reumaux (1996)

=== T–U ===
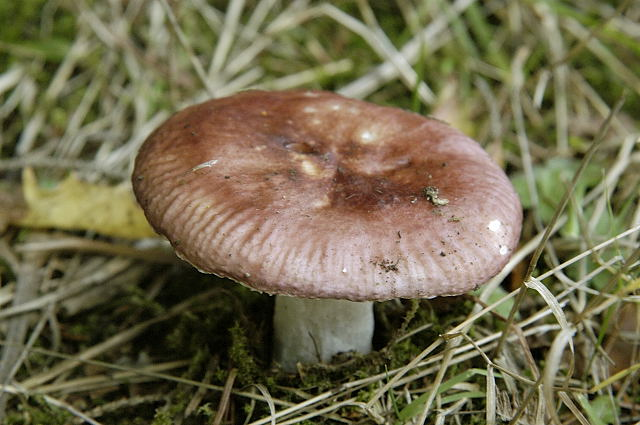
Russula turci Bres. 1882

- Russula taeniospora Einhell. (1986)
- Russula taetra Trappe & T.F. Elliott (2018)
- Russula taigarum Ruots. & Vauras (1990)
- Russula taliensis W.F. Chiu (1945)
- Russula tanzaniae Buyck (1993)
- Russula tapawera (T. Lebel) T. Lebel (2007)
- Russula tarda Jurkeit, Grauw. & J. Albers (2012)
- Russula tawai McNabb (1973)
- Russula tengii G.J. Li & H.A. Wen (2019)
- Russula tennesseensis Singer (1939)
- Russula tenuiceps Kauffman (1909)
- Russula tenuipilosa Buyck (1990)
- Russula tenuithrix Buyck (1993)
- Russula terenopus Romagn. (1952)
- Russula termitaria Buyck (2007)
- Russula terrena Buyck & Sharp (2007)
- Russula testacea Buyck (1988)
- Russula testaceiceps Murrill (1946)
- Russula testaceoaurantiaca Beeli (1928)
- Russula texensis Buyck, Adamčík & D.P. Lewis (2008)
- Russula thapsina Singer & L.D. Gómez (1997)
- Russula thaxteri (Singer) Trappe & T.F. Elliott (2018)
- Russula theissenii Rick (1907)
- Russula theodoroui (T. Lebel) T. Lebel (2017)
- Russula thiersii Trappe & T.F. Elliott (2018)
- Russula thindii K. Das & S.L. Mill. (2014)
- Russula thuringiaca De Lange, F. Hampe & Girwert (2023)
- Russula tinctipes J. Blum ex Bon (1986)
- Russula tjibodensis (Henn.) Sacc. & P. Syd. (1902)
- Russula tombrunsii Trappe & T.F. Elliott (2018)
- Russula tomentosa Buyck (1988)
- Russula torulosa Bres. (1929)
- Russula transiens (Singer) Romagn. (1967)
- Russula trappei (T. Lebel) T. Lebel (2017)
- Russula tricholomopsis McNabb (1973)
- Russula tricolor R. Heim (1938)
- Russula trimbachii Bon (1997)
- Russula tristis Velen. (1920)
- Russula tsokae K. Das, Van de Putte & Buyck (2010)
- Russula tuberculata Murrill (1940)
- Russula tuberculosa R. Heim (1938)
- Russula tumidipes R. Socha (2011)
- Russula turci Bres. (1882)
- Russula turpis Sanon & Buyck (2014)
- Russula tyrrhenica Sarnari (1984)
- Russula ulixis Reumaux (1999)
- Russula umbrina B. Knauth (1926)
- Russula umerensis McNabb (1973)
- Russula uncialiformis Murrill (1943)
- Russula unicalifornica Trappe & T.F. Elliott (2018)
- Russula unicolor Romagn. (1967)
- Russula usambarae Buyck (1993)
- Russula ustulata De Lange & Verbeken (2021)
- Russula uttarakhandia A. Ghosh & K. Das (2019)

=== V–Z ===
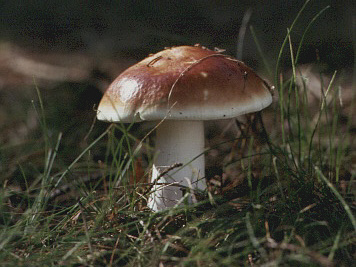
Russula vesca Fr. 1836

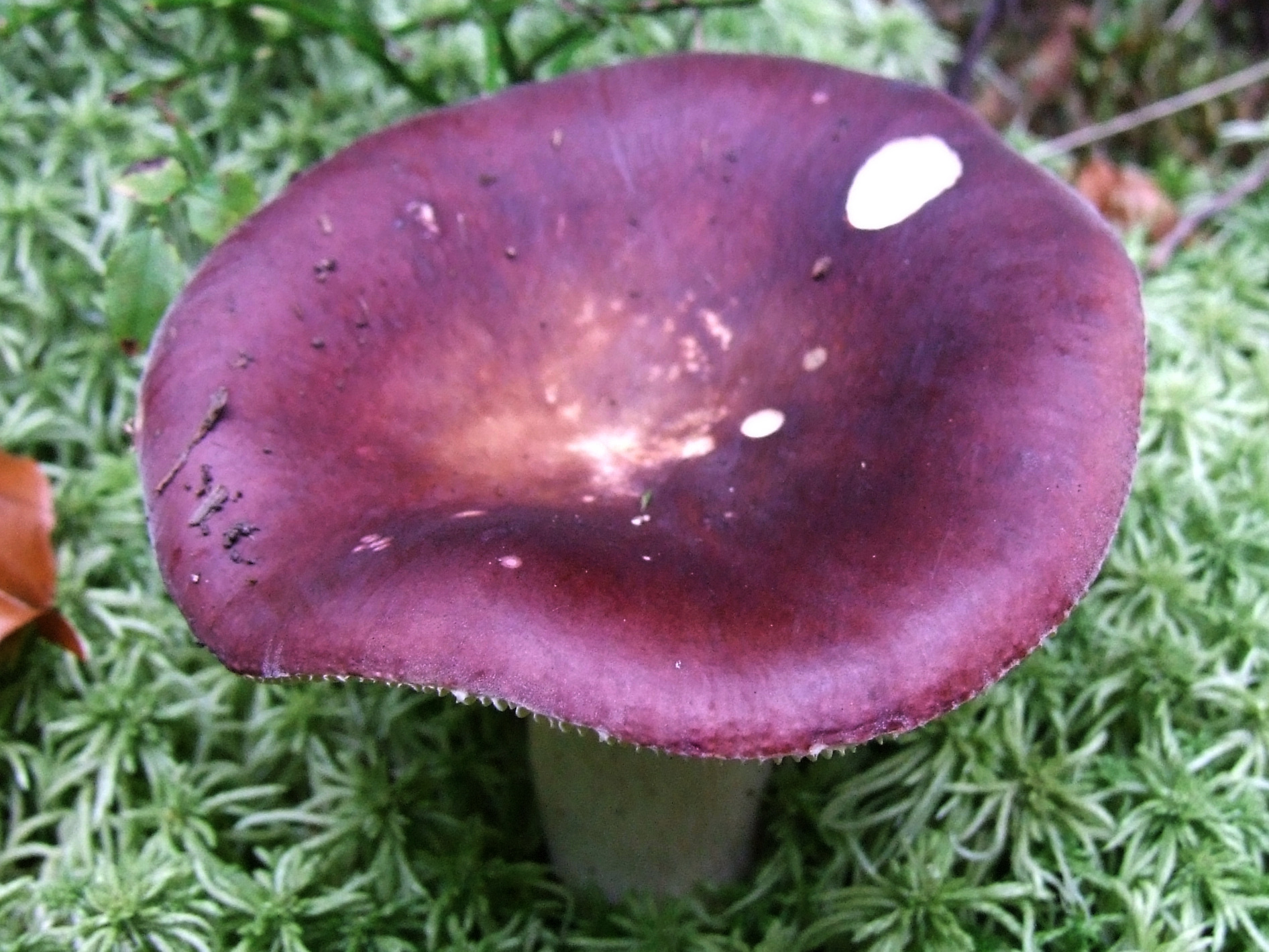
Russula vinosa Lindblad 1901

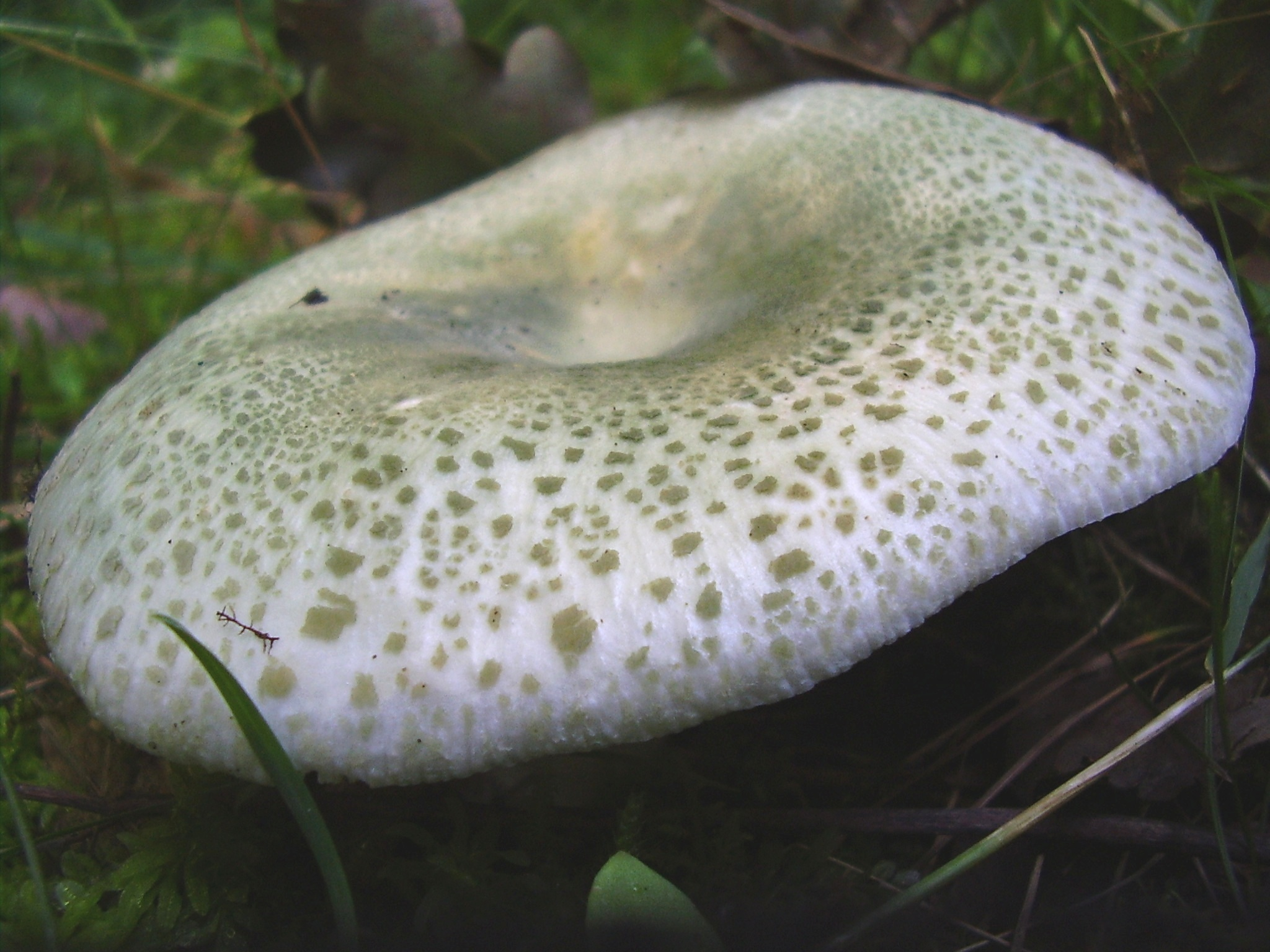
Russula virescens (Schaeff. 1774) Fr. 1836

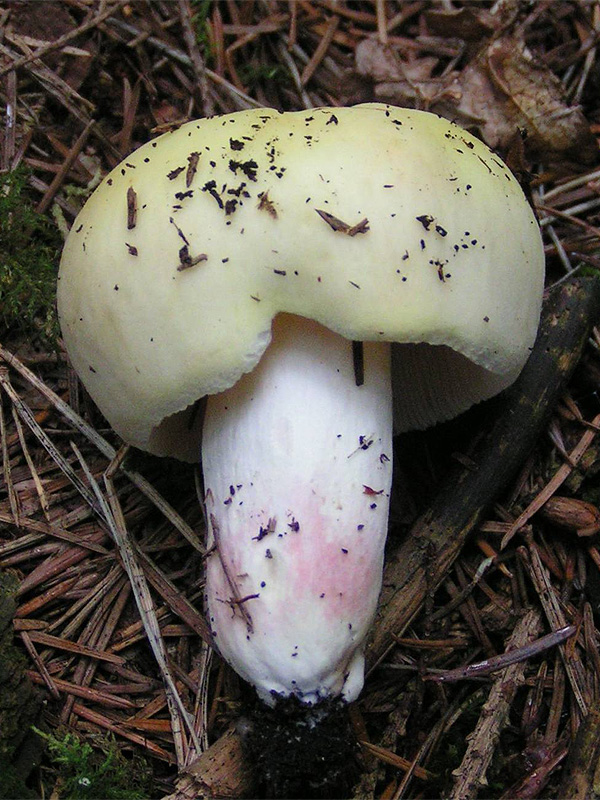
Russula violeipes Quél. 1897

- Russula valtellinensis Moron (2010)
- Russula vanillina Kučera (1930)
- Russula variabilispora (Singer & A.H. Sm.) Trappe & T.F. Elliott (2018)
- Russula variegata Singer (1958)
- Russula variegatula Romagn. ex Bon (1983)
- Russula variicolor Murrill (1943)
- Russula variispora T. Lebel (2007)
- Russula vassilievae Bulach (1987)
- Russula vaurasiana K. Das & J.R. Sharma (2005)
- Russula velenovskyi Melzer & Zvára (1928)
- Russula velutina Buyck (1988)
- Russula venezueliana Singer (1952)
- Russula ventricosipes Peck (1902)
- Russula venusta Murrill (1946)
- Russula venustissima Carteret & Reumaux (2004)
- Russula verna Singer (1983)
- Russula verrucosa A. Blytt (1905)
- Russula verrucospora Yu Song & L.H. Qiu (2018)
- Russula versatilis Romagn. (1967)
- Russula versicolor Jul. Schäff. (1931)
- Russula vesca Fr. (1836)
- Russula vesicatoria Burl. (1944)
- Russula vesiculosa (Coker & Couch) Trappe & T.F. Elliott (2018)
- Russula veternosa Fr. (1838)
- Russula vidalii Trappe & T.F. Elliott (2018)
- Russula vilgalysii Trappe & T.F. Elliott (2018)
- Russula vinacea Burl. (1915)
- Russula vinaceocuticulata McNabb (1973)
- Russula vinaceodora (Calonge & J.M. Vidal) Trappe & T.F. Elliott (2018)
- Russula vinaceo-olivascens R. Socha (2011)
- Russula vinicolor (A.H. Sm.) Trappe & T.F. Elliott (2018)
- Russula vinosa Lindblad (1901)
- Russula vinosirosea Murrill (1943)
- Russula vinosobrunnea (Bres.) Romagn. (1967)
- Russula vinosobrunneola G.J. Li & R.L. Zhao (2018)
- Russula vinosoflavescens Trendel & F. Hampe (2017)
- Russula vinosopurpurea Jul. Schäff. (1938)
- Russula vinososordida Ruots. & Vauras (2000)
- Russula violacea Quél. (1883)
- Russula violaceoalba Jurkeit, Krauch & U. Krauch (2024)
- Russula violaceoides Hora (1960)
- Russula violaceoincarnata Knudsen & T. Borgen (1992)
- Russula violaceo-olivascens Bidaud (1996)
- Russula violaceotunicata Buyck & Courtec. (1991)
- Russula violeipes Quél. (1898)
- Russula virentirubens Velen. (1920)
- Russula virescens (Schaeff.) Fr. (1836)
- Russula viridella Peck (1906)
- Russula viridescens Krombh. (1845)
- Russula viridicans Carteret & Reumaux (2005)
- Russula viridicinnamomea F. Yuan & Y. Song (2019)
- Russula viridioculata Burl. (1921)
- Russula viridipes Banning & Peck (1891)
- Russula viridirobusta Buyck (1989)
- Russula viridis Velen. (1920)
- Russula viridofusca Grund (1979)
- Russula viridulorosea Herp. (1912)
- Russula viroviolacea Imler (1984)
- Russula viscida Kudřna (1928)
- Russula viscidula Buyck (1988)
- Russula viscosa Henn. (1899)
- Russula vivida McNabb (1973)
- Russula wahgiensis Singer (1960)
- Russula wangii G.J. Li, H.A. Wen & R.L. Zhao (2016)
- Russula watsoniana Murrill (1939)
- Russula werneri Maire (1937)
- Russula westii Murrill (1941)
- Russula westresii (T. Lebel) T. Lebel (2017)
- Russula wielangtae G.M. Gates, Caboň & Jančovič. (2019)
- Russula wirrabarensis (Grgur.) T. Lebel (2017)
- Russula wollumbina Grgur. (1997)
- Russula wrightii Raithelh. (1977)
- Russula wulingshanensis C.L. Hou, Hao Zhou bis & G.Q. Cheng (2023)
- Russula xantho Shaffer (1990)
- Russula xanthocarpa (T. Lebel) T. Lebel (2017)
- Russula xanthoporphyrea Thiers (1997)
- Russula xanthospora (Hawker) Trappe & T.F. Elliott (2018)
- Russula xanthovirens Yu Song & L.H. Qiu (2018)
- Russula xenochlora P.D. Orton (1999)
- Russula xerampelina (Schaeff.) Fr. (1838) – shrimp mushroom
- Russula xerampelinoides K. Das, I. Bera, A. Ghosh & Buyck (2021)
- Russula xerophila (M.E. Sm. & Trappe) Trappe & T.F. Elliott (2018)
- Russula xylophila Beeli (1936)
- Russula yadongensis S.H. Wang, R.L. Zhao & B. Cao (2023)
- Russula yaeneroensis Buyck (1990)
- Russula yanheensis T.C. Wen, Hapuar. & K.D. Hyde (2017)
- Russula yanshanensis C.L. Hou, Hao Zhou & G.Q. Cheng (2022)
- Russula yunnanensis (Singer) Singer (1942)
- Russula zangii Trappe & T.F. Elliott (2018)
- Russula zelleri Burl. (1936)
- Russula zelleriana (Singer & A.H. Sm.) Trappe & T.F. Elliott (2018)
- Russula zenkeri (Henn.) Singer (1973)
- Russula zephyrovelutipes Manz & F. Hampe (2021)
- Russula zhejiangensis G.J. Li & H.A. Wen (2011)
- Russula zhuzuijun Shu H. Li & X.H. Wang (2023)
- Russula zonata S. Liu & J. Zhi Qiu (2024)
- Russula zonatula Ebbesen & Jul. Schäff. (1952)
- Russula zvarae Velen. (1922)
