= Orange milkcap =

Orange milkcap is the common name of a fungus, which may refer to:

- Lactarius aurantiacus
- Lactarius deterrimus
- Lactarius subflammeus
