= Russula benwooi =

Scientific classification
- Kingdom: Fungi
- Division: Basidiomycota
- Class: Agaricomycetes
- Order: Russulales
- Family: Russulaceae
- Genus: Russula
- Species: R. benwooi

Binomial name
- Russula benwooi Bazzic., D. Mill. & Buyck

Species of fungus

Russula benwooi
- Mycological characteristics
- Gills on hymenium
- Cap is convex or depressed
- Hymenium is adnate
- Stipe is bare
- Spore print is cream
- Ecology is mycorrhizal
- Edibility is unknown

Russula benwooi, commonly known as Ben Woo's russula or Ben's brittlegill, is a species of mushroom in the family Russulaceae. It was named in honor of Benjamin Woo, who collected and studied Russula mushrooms in the Pacific Northwest.

== Description ==
The cap of Russula benwooi varies in color from tan to reddish to greenish to purplish. It starts out convex and becomes broadly convex to flat or depressed in age. It is about 8-12 centimeters in diameter. The gills are cream-colored to yellow, and adnate. The stipe is white and sometimes has a reddish or pinkish tinge. It sometimes bruises brown, and is about 6-14 centimeters long and 1-2 centimeters wide. The spore print is cream-colored.

== Habitat and ecology ==
Russula benwooi is mycorrhizal, and grows under western hemlock. It may also grow with douglas fir and other conifers.
