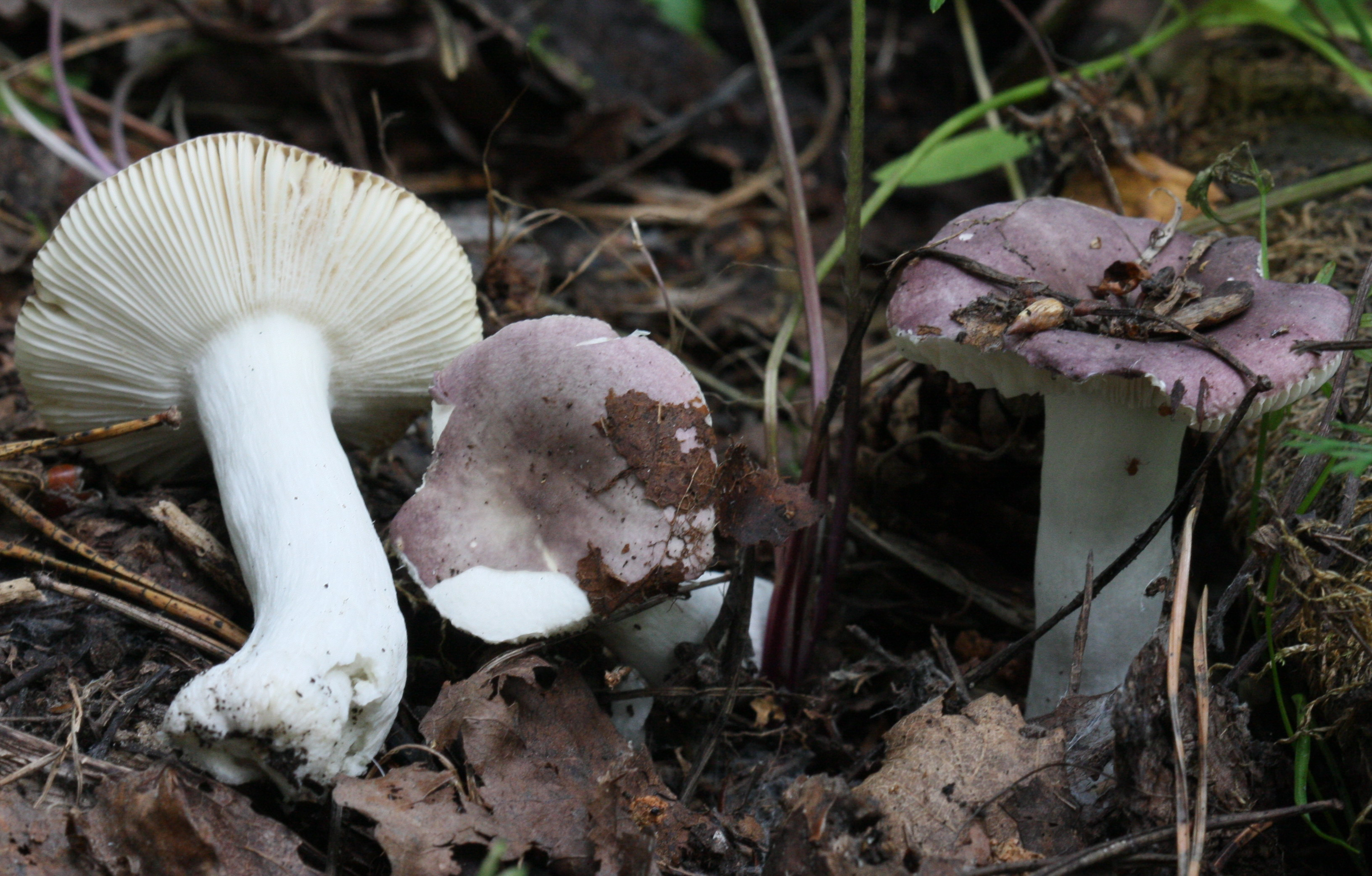

Scientific classification
- Kingdom: Fungi
- Division: Basidiomycota
- Class: Agaricomycetes
- Order: Russulales
- Family: Russulaceae
- Genus: Russula
- Species: R. violacea

Binomial name
- Russula violacea Quél.

= Russula violacea =

Species of fungus

Russula violacea, is a species of agaric fungus in the family Russulaceae first described by Lucien Quélet.

== Distribution and habitat ==
R. violacea has been noted in North America, Asia and Europe, with the most occurrences in Europe. It grows in coniferous and deciduous forests, under Quercus, Betula and Populus trees, it has been also spotted on coal dumps. It fruits between August and October.
