= Russula pseudointegra =

Scientific classification
- Domain: Eukaryota
- Kingdom: Fungi
- Division: Basidiomycota
- Class: Agaricomycetes
- Order: Russulales
- Family: Russulaceae
- Genus: Russula
- Species: R. pseudointegra

Binomial name
- Russula pseudointegra Arnould & Goris ex R. Maire 1907

Species of fungus

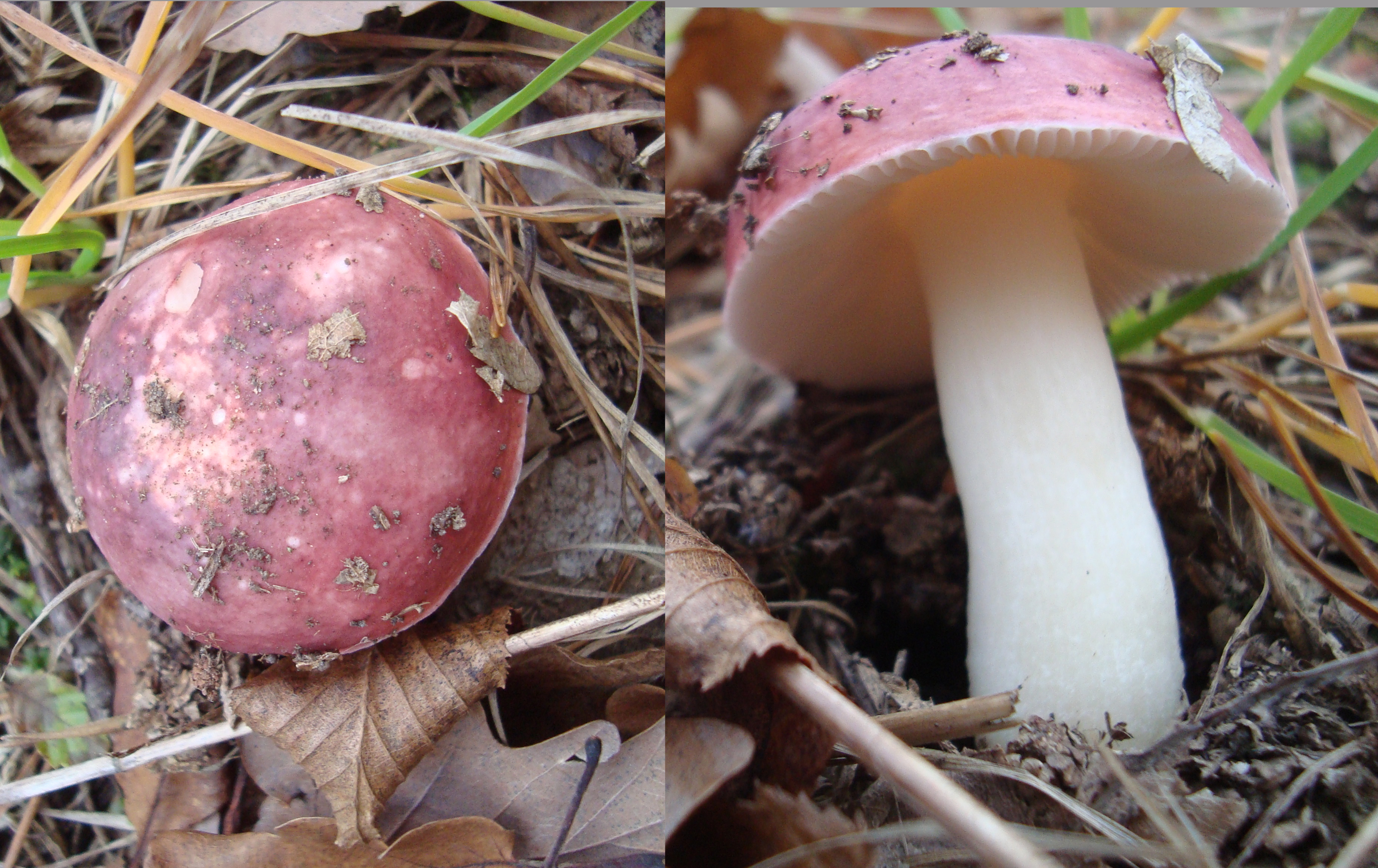

Russula pseudointegra is an inedible, quite rare mushroom of the genus Russula, with a similar habitat and appearance to Russula rosea. Russula pseudointegra is distinguished by its hot tasting flesh.

== See also ==
- List of Russula species
