= Multifurca zonaria =

Scientific classification
- Domain: Eukaryota
- Kingdom: Fungi
- Division: Basidiomycota
- Class: Agaricomycetes
- Order: Russulales
- Family: Russulaceae
- Genus: Multifurca
- Species: M. zonaria

Binomial name
- Multifurca zonaria (Buyck & Desjardin) Buyck & V.Hofst. (2008)

Synonyms
- Russula zonaria Buyck & Desjardin (2003)

Species of fungus

Multifurca zonaria is a species of mushroom-forming fungus in the genus Russulaceae. Originally described from Thailand as a Russula species in 2003, it was moved to the newly created genus Multifurca in 2008.
