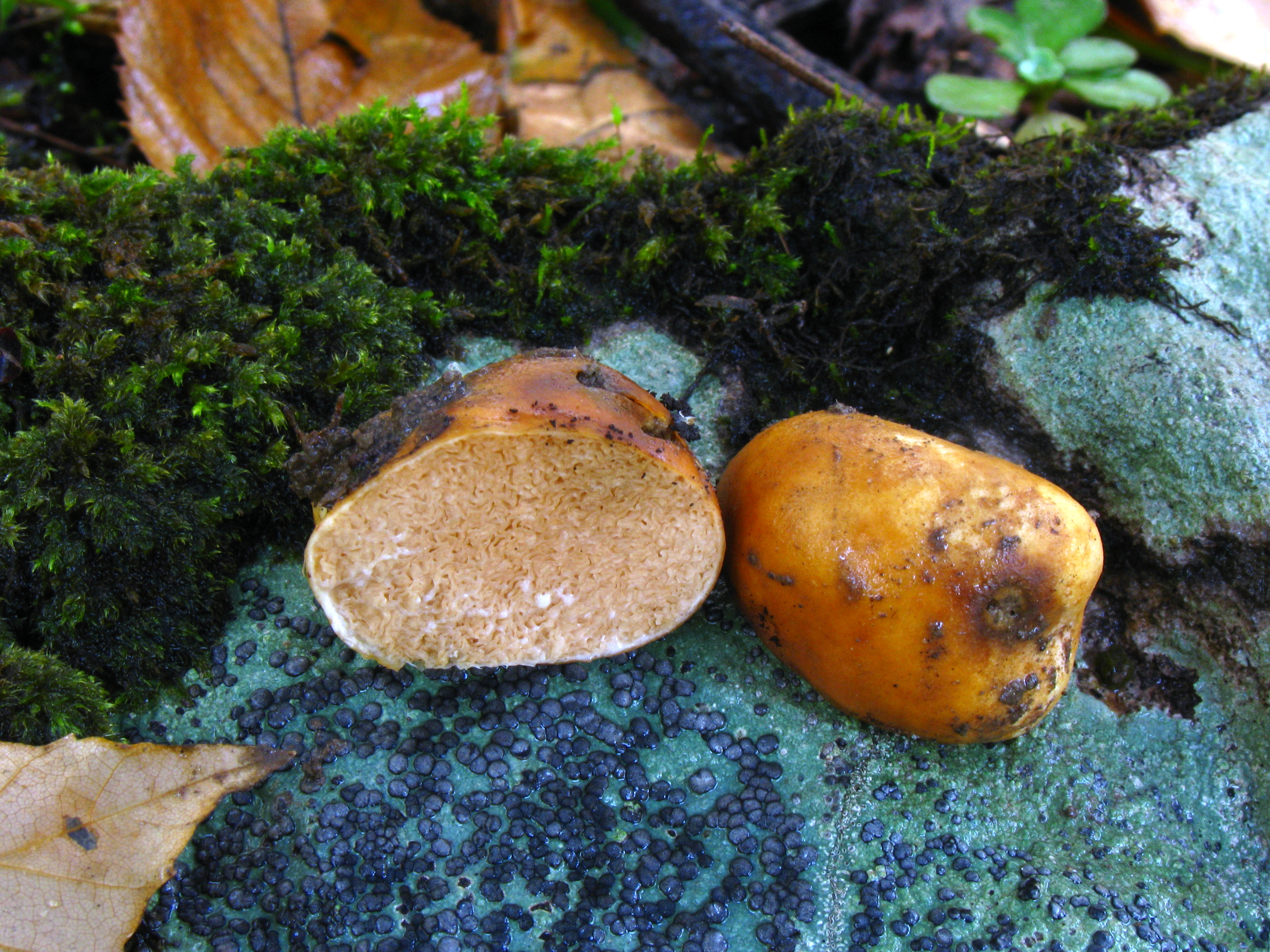
- Zelleromyces cinnabarinus

Scientific classification
- Kingdom: Fungi
- Division: Basidiomycota
- Class: Agaricomycetes
- Order: Russulales
- Family: Russulaceae
- Genus: Zelleromyces; Singer & A.H.Sm. (1960)

Type species
- Zelleromyces cinnabarinus Singer & A.H.Sm. (1960)

= Zelleromyces =

Genus of fungi

Zelleromyces is a genus of fungi in the family Russulaceae. It was first described by mycologists Rolf Singer and Alexander H. Smith in 1960 to contain hypogeous (underground) fungi with gasteroid fruit bodies that "bleed" latex when they are cut.

The genus was circumscribed in Mem. Torrey Bot. Club vol.21 (3) on page 18 in 1960.

The genus name of Zelleromyces is in honour of Sanford Myron Zeller (1885–1948), who was an American mycologist.

Phylogenetic analyses show that Zelleromyces species fall into the genus Lactarius. Nevertheless, the genus name is still in use and has not been formally synonymised with Lactarius yet.

== Species ==
As accepted by Species Fungorum;

- Zelleromyces albellus (Singer & A.H. Sm.) Trappe, T. Lebel & Castellano (2002)
- Zelleromyces alveolatus (Singer & A.H. Sm.) Trappe, T. Lebel & Castellano (2002)
- Zelleromyces australiensis (Berk. & Broome) Pegler & T.W.K. Young (1979)
- Zelleromyces cinnabarinus Singer & A.H. Sm. (1961)
- Zelleromyces gilkeyae Singer & A.H. Sm. (1961)
- Zelleromyces glabrellus (Zeller & C.W. Dodge) Singer & A.H. Sm. (1961)
- Zelleromyces lactifer (B.C. Zhang & Y.N. Yu) Trappe, T. Lebel & Castellano (2002)
- Zelleromyces malaiensis (Corner & Hawker) A.H. Sm. (1963)
- Zelleromyces oregonensis Singer & A.H. Sm. (1961)
- Zelleromyces papyraceus (Singer & A.H. Sm.) Trappe, T. Lebel & Castellano (2002)
- Zelleromyces pterosporus (E. Horak) Trappe, T. Lebel & Castellano (2002)
- Zelleromyces ramispinus (B.C. Zhang & Y.N. Yu) Trappe, T. Lebel & Castellano (2002)
- Zelleromyces ravenelii (Berk. & M.A. Curtis) Singer & A.H. Sm. (1961)
- Zelleromyces rogersonii Fogel & States (2001)
- Zelleromyces scissilis (Zeller & C.W. Dodge) Trappe, T. Lebel & Castellano (2002)
- Zelleromyces sculptisporus S.L. Mill. (1999)
- Zelleromyces sinensis B. Liu, K. Tao & Ming C. Chang (1993)
- Zelleromyces versicaulis S.L. Mill. (1999)

Former species; (all are Russulaceae family)

- Z. australiensis sensu Pegler & Young = Zelleromyces glabrellus
- Z. claridgei Trappe (2003) = Arcangeliella claridgei
- Z. corkii Trappe & Claridge (2003) = Arcangeliella corkii
- Z. daucinus G.W. Beaton, Pegler & T.W.K. Young (1984) = Arcangeliella daucina
- Z. dendriticus T. Lebel (2002) = Lactifluus dendriticus
- Z. gardneri (Zeller & C.W. Dodge) Singer & A.H. Sm. (1961) = Lactarius gardneri
- Z. giennensis Mor.-Arr., J. Gómez & Calonge (1998) = Lactarius giennensis
- Z. hispanicus Calonge & Pegler (1998) = Lactarius aurantiacus
- Z. josserandii Malençon (1976) = Lactarius josserandii
- Z. major (J.W. Cribb) A.H. Sm. (1963) = Arcangeliella major
- Z. meridionalis Calonge, Mor.-Arr. & J. Gómez (1998) = Russula meridionalis
- Z. meridionalis Calonge, Mor.-Arr. & J. Gómez (2000) = Russula meridionalis
- Z. soehneri (Zeller & C.W. Dodge) Trappe, T. Lebel & Castellano (2002) = Lactarius soehneri
- Z. stephensii (Berk.) A.H. Sm. (1963) = Lactarius stephensii
