= Russula pallidula =

Scientific classification
- Domain: Eukaryota
- Kingdom: Fungi
- Division: Basidiomycota
- Class: Agaricomycetes
- Order: Russulales
- Family: Russulaceae
- Genus: Russula
- Species: R. pallidula

Binomial name
- Russula pallidula B. Chen & J.F. Liang, Chen et al. (2019)

Species of fungus

Russula pallidula is a species of agaric fungus in the family Russulaceae native to southern China.
