= Multifurca roxburghii =

Scientific classification
- Domain: Eukaryota
- Kingdom: Fungi
- Division: Basidiomycota
- Class: Agaricomycetes
- Order: Russulales
- Family: Russulaceae
- Genus: Multifurca
- Species: M. roxburghii

Binomial name
- Multifurca roxburghii Buyck & V.Hofst. (2008)

Species of fungus

Multifurca roxburghii is a species of mushroom-forming fungus in the genus Russulaceae. Found in Himachal Pradesh, India, where it associates with chir pine (Pinus roxburghii). It was described as new to science in 2008, then under the name "M. roxburghiae", which is now considered an orthographic variant.
