= Gastrolactarius camphoratus =

Conservation status
- Endangered (IUCN 3.1)

Scientific classification
- Kingdom: Fungi
- Division: Basidiomycota
- Class: Agaricomycetes
- Order: Russulales
- Family: Russulaceae
- Genus: Gastrolactarius
- Species: G. camphoratus

Binomial name
- Gastrolactarius camphoratus (Singer & A.H. Sm.) J.M. Vidal

Species of fungus

Gastrolactarius camphoratus is a species of fungus native to the Pacific Northwest of North America. Initially described as Elasmomyces camphoratus in 1960, it gained its current name in 2004.
