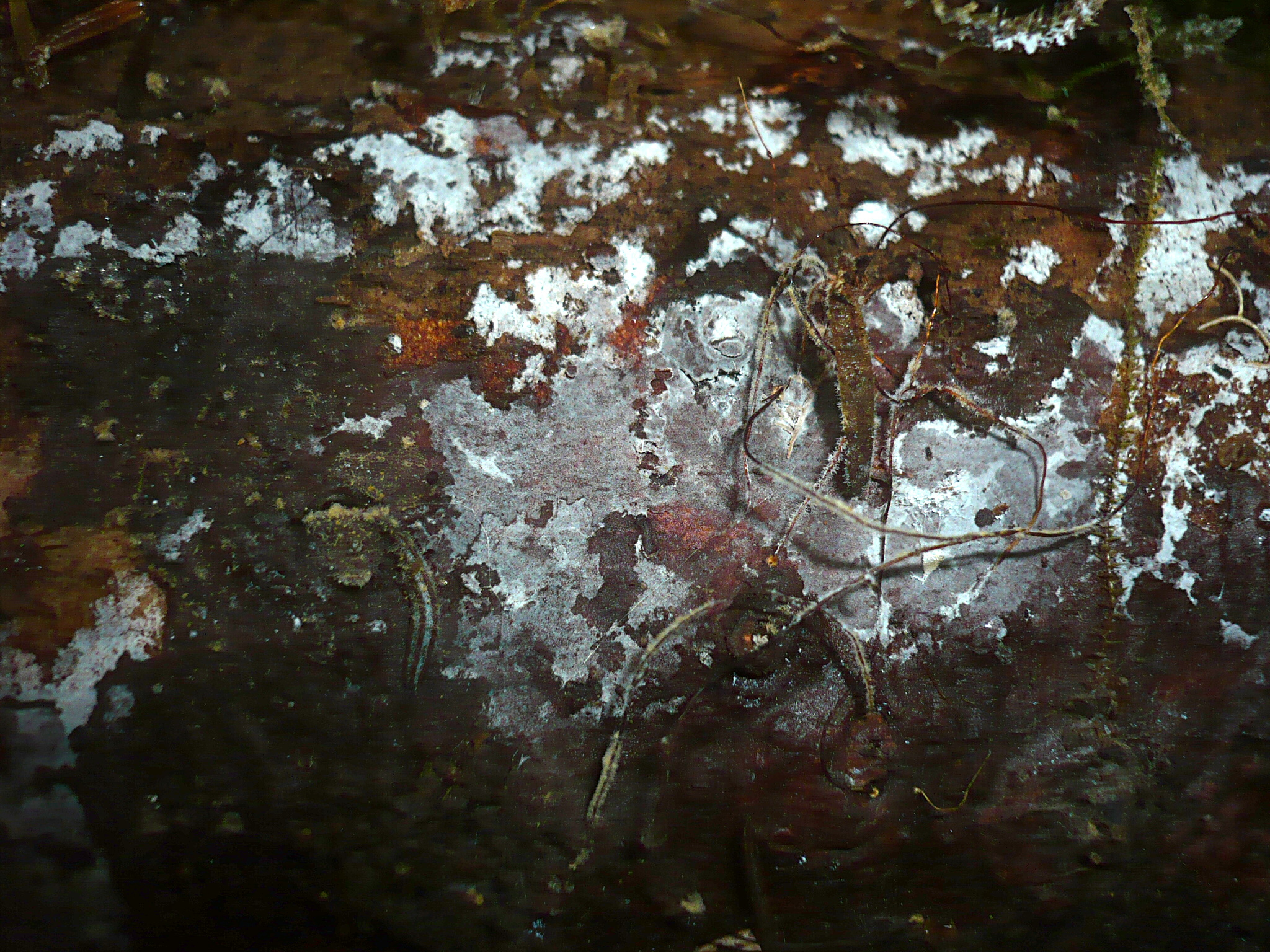
- Boidinia furfuracea

Scientific classification
- Kingdom: Fungi
- Division: Basidiomycota
- Class: Agaricomycetes
- Order: Russulales
- Family: Russulaceae
- Genus: Boidinia; Stalpers & Hjortstam (1982)

Type species
- Boidinia furfuracea (Bres.) Stalpers & Hjortstam (1982)

Species
- See text

= Boidinia =

Genus of fungi

Boidinia is a genus of crust fungi in the family Russulaceae. The genus is widely distributed, and contains 10 species. Boidinia was described in 1982 with the type species Boidinia furfuracea (formerly placed in Gloeocystidiellum). It is named in honor of French mycologist Jacques Boidin.

N. Maekawa (1994) wrote: "The genus Boidinia is a satellite genus of Gloeocystidiellum and differs from the latter in forming loose texture in subiculum and globose, echinulate to verrucose basidiospores."

Boidinia is probably not monophyletic and needs taxonomical redefinition.

== Species ==
The Catalogue of Life, in September 2025, recognizes 12 species of Boidinia:

- Boidinia aculeata (Sheng H. Wu) E. Larss. & K.H. Larss.
- Boidinia borbonica Boidin, Lanq. & Gilles
- Boidinia cana Sheng H. Wu
- Boidinia dendrophysata Boidin & Gilles
- Boidinia donkii (S.S. Rattan) Sheng H. Wu & P.K. Buchanan
- Boidinia furfuracea (Bres.) Stalpers & Hjortstam
- Boidinia lacticolor (Bres.) Hjortstam & Ryvarden
- Boidinia luteola Sheng H. Wu
- Boidinia macrospora Sheng H. Wu
- Boidinia parva Ghob.-Nejh., S.L. Liu, Y.C. Dai & Langer
- Boidinia peroxydata (Rick) Hjortstam & Ryvarden
- Boidinia propinqua (H.S. Jacks. & Dearden) Hjortstam & Ryvarden
