= Russula cerolens =

Scientific classification
- Kingdom: Fungi
- Division: Basidiomycota
- Class: Agaricomycetes
- Order: Russulales
- Family: Russulaceae
- Genus: Russula
- Species: R. cerolens

Binomial name
- Russula cerolens Shaffer

Species of fungus

Russula cerolens
- Mycological characteristics
- Gills on hymenium
- Cap is convex or depressed
- Hymenium is adnate or adnexed
- Stipe is bare
- Spore print is white
- Edibility is unknown or poisonous

Russula cerolens, commonly known as the pocket-stalked russula or pocket-stalked brittlegill, is a species of mushroom in the family Russulaceae. Its edibility is unknown, and it may be poisonous. It grows under both hardwoods and conifers.

== Description ==
The cap of Russula cerolens is brownish in color and about 4-11 centimeters in diameter. It starts out round, becoming convex and eventually depressed in age. The gills start out white and become cream-colored or yellowish as the mushroom matures. They are adnexed to adnate. The stipe is about 3-8 centimeters long and 1–2.5 centimeters wide. It is white in color and often has an orange base. In older specimens, the stipe is more cream colored, often with brownish or orangish stains. The spore print is white. The mushroom has a bitter to acrid taste. It is often described as having an unpleasant odor.

== Habitat and ecology ==
Russula cerolens is found under both hardwood and conifer trees. In coastal areas, it is known to fruit in large numbers under shore pine trees. It is found throughout the Pacific Northwest. It is also found in California, where it often grows under Monterey pine trees along the coast.
