= Russula campinensis =

Scientific classification
- Kingdom: Fungi
- Division: Basidiomycota
- Class: Agaricomycetes
- Order: Russulales
- Family: Russulaceae
- Genus: Russula
- Species: R. campinensis

Binomial name
- Russula campinensis (Singer) T.W. Henkel, Aime & S.L. Mill. (2000)

Synonyms
- Lactarius campinensis Singer 1985; Pleurogala campinensis (Singer) Redhead & Norvell (1993)

Species of fungus

Russula campinensis is a neotropical species in the genus Russula. This species is highly different from most other known Russula species in that it has very small (2–17 mm), pleurotoid fruitbodies that develop on tree trunks in up to 2 m elevation from the forest floor. It was described as Lactarius campinensis from Brazil (Amazonas) by Rolf Singer. T.W. Henkel, M.C. Aime and S.L. Miller later found this species in tropical rainforest of the Pakaraima Mountains, Guyana, and showed with molecular phylogenetic methods that it belongs to Russula. Although forming fruitbodies on wood, R. campinensis is a root-symbiotic ectomycorrhizal species and has been observed in Guyana associated with Dicymbe altsonii and D. jenzenii trees in the legume subfamily Caesalpinioideae.

== See also ==
- List of Russula species
