= Multifurca furcata =

Scientific classification
- Domain: Eukaryota
- Kingdom: Fungi
- Division: Basidiomycota
- Class: Agaricomycetes
- Order: Russulales
- Family: Russulaceae
- Genus: Multifurca
- Species: M. furcata

Binomial name
- Multifurca furcata (Coker) Buyck & V. Hofstetter (2008)

Synonyms
- Lactarius furcatus Coker 1918

Species of fungus

Multifurca furcata is a rare mushroom-forming fungus in the genus Multifurca. It was originally described as a Lactarius species in 1918 and was moved to the new genus Multifurca in 2008. With the genus Lactarius it shares the exudation of milk-like latex; however, it is microscopically and molecularly distinct. It has been found very infrequently, with currently known localities in the United States, Mexico, Costa Rica, and China.
