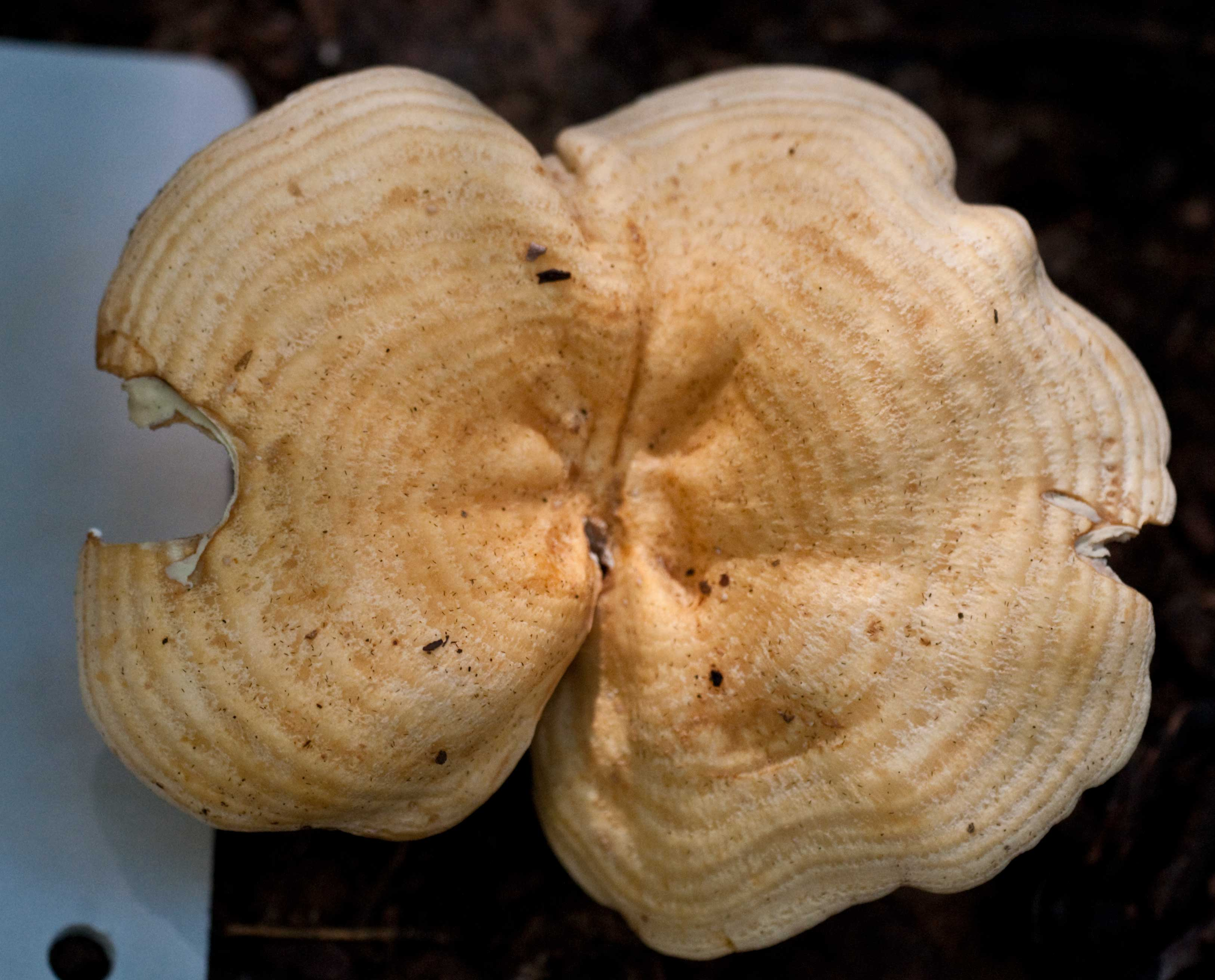
- Unidentified Multifurca species from New South Wales, Australia

Scientific classification
- Kingdom: Fungi
- Division: Basidiomycota
- Class: Agaricomycetes
- Order: Russulales
- Family: Russulaceae
- Genus: Multifurca; Buyck & V. Hofst. (2008)

Type species
- Multifurca ochricompacta (Bills & O.K.Mill.) Buyck & V. Hofst. (2008)

Species
- 12, see article

= Multifurca =

Genus of fungi

- - - Lactarius
    - Multifurca
  - Russula
- Lactifluus

Phylogenetic relationships of Lactarius, Lactifluus, Multifurca, and Russula.

Multifurca is a rare genus of ectomycorrhizal fungi in the family Russulaceae. It was described in 2008, after molecular phylogenetic study had shown that it forms a monophyletic lineage within the family, sister to Lactarius. The genus contains six species known from the United States, Mexico, Costa Rica, India, China, Thailand, Australia, and New Caledonia, but so far has not been reported from Europe, Africa, or South America. Four of those species were formerly classified as Russula section Ochricompactae, and Multifurca furcata was originally described as a Lactarius species.

Multifurca is morphologically intermediate between Lactarius and Russula: Fruitbodies have adnate to subdecurrent gills and are zonate; latex (as in Lactarius and Lactifluus) is present only in M. furcata; spore print is orange; spores themselves are very small with only faint ornamentation.

The widespread but only punctual records of Multifurca suggest an ancient, relictual distribution.

== Species ==
The Global Biodiversity Information Facility, Index Fungorum and MycoBank list 12 accepted species.

- M. albovelutina Nam Kyu Kim, Hyun Lee & Young Woon Lim (2018)
- M. aurantiophylla (Buyck & Ducousso) Buyck & V.Hofst. (2008)
- M. australis Halling, T.Lebel & Buyck (2018)
- M. furcata (Coker) Buyck & V.Hofst. (2008)
- M. mellea Nam Kyu Kim & Wisitr. (2018)
- M. mesoamericana Buyck & Halling (2018)
- M. ochricompacta (Bills & O.K.Mill.) Buyck & V.Hofst. (2008)
- M. orientalis X.H.Wang (2018)
- M. pseudofurcata X.H.Wang (2018)
- M. roxburghii Buyck & V.Hofst. (2008)
- M. stenophylla (Berk.) T.Lebel, C.W.Dunk & T.W.May(2012)
- M. zonaria (Buyck & Desjardin) Buyck & V.Hofst. (2008)
