= Gloeopeniophorella =

Scientific classification
- Kingdom: Fungi
- Division: Basidiomycota
- Class: Agaricomycetes
- Order: Russulales
- Family: Russulaceae
- Genus: Gloeopeniophorella; Rick (1934)

Type species
- Gloeopeniophorella rubroflava Rick (1934)

Species
- G. griseolutea G. rubroflava G. sacrata G. singularis

Genus of fungi

Gloeopeniophorella is a genus of crust-like, wood-decaying fungi in the family Russulaceae. It contains six known species. Gloeopeniophorella was first described by Brazilian mycologist Johannes Rick in 1934.

Hjortstam & Ryvarden (2007) wrote on Gloeopeniophorella: "The genus should be fairly easy to recognize with species having an almost smooth hymenophore, hyphae without clamp-connections, both metuloids and gloeocystidia, and spores that are both rugose and amyloid. We are of the opinion that the dextrinoid reaction of the metuloids in Dextrinocystidium is not an important character for generic separation."

The Catalogue of Life, in September 2025, recognizes 4 species of Gloeopeniophorella:

1. Gloeopeniophorella griseolutea Rick
2. Gloeopeniophorella rubroflava Rick
3. Gloeopeniophorella sacrata (G. Cunn.) Hjortstam & Ryvarden
4. Gloeopeniophorella singularis (Boidin, Lanq. & Gilles) Hjortstam & Ryvarden
