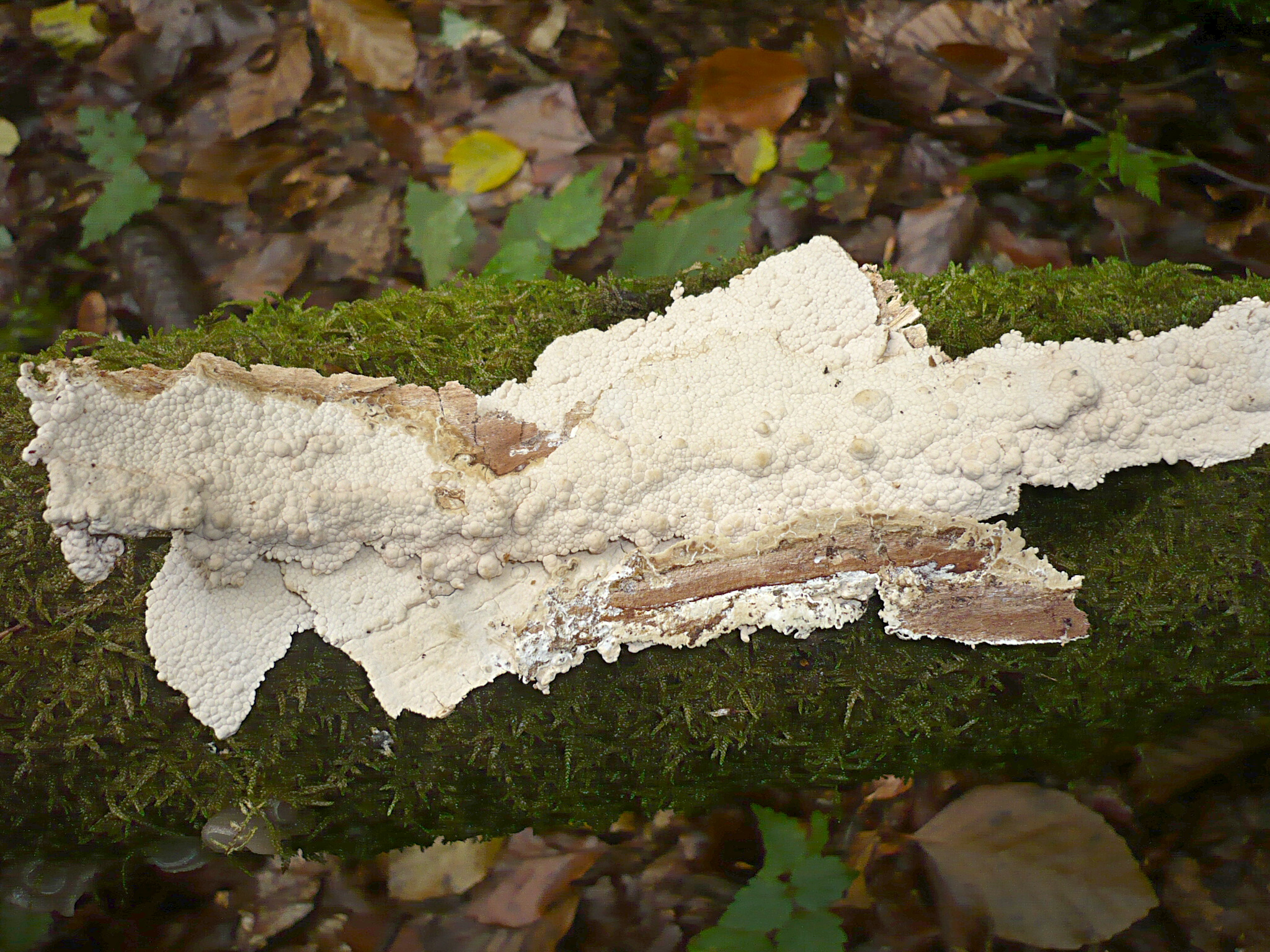

Scientific classification
- Kingdom: Fungi
- Division: Basidiomycota
- Class: Agaricomycetes
- Order: Russulales
- Family: Gloeocystidiellaceae
- Genus: Gloeocystidiellum
- Species: G. porosum

Binomial name
- Gloeocystidiellum porosum (Berk. & M.A.Curtis) Donk, (1931)

Synonyms
- Corticium letendrei; Corticium porosum; Corticium stramineum; Gloeocystidium letendrei; Gloeocystidium porosum; Terana porosa; Xerocarpus letendrei [as "letendri"]

= Gloeocystidiellum porosum =

Species of fungus

Gloeocystidiellum porosum is a fungal plant pathogen. It is a corticioid homobasidiomycete that grows on various types of dead wood.
