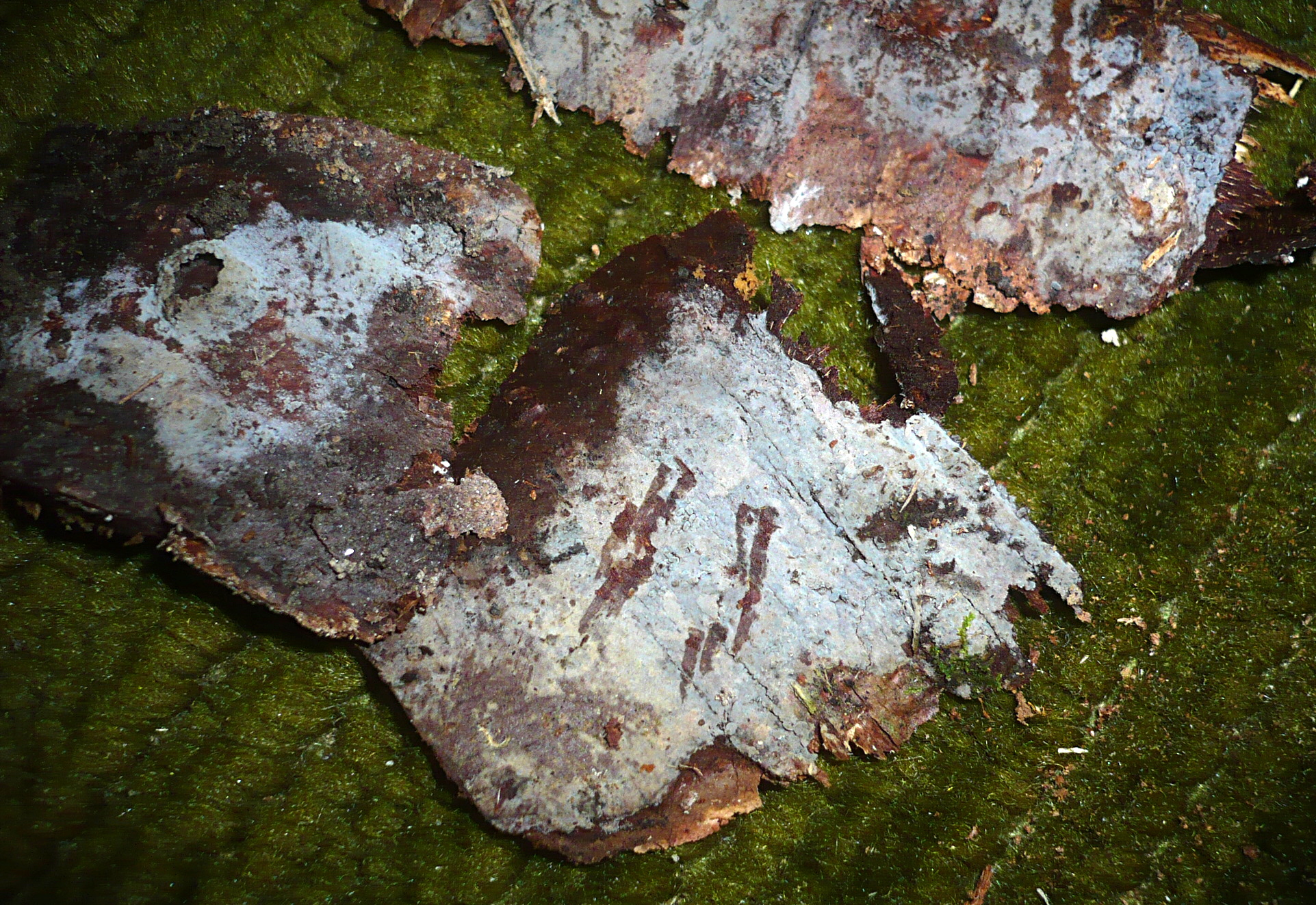

Scientific classification
- Kingdom: Fungi
- Division: Basidiomycota
- Class: Agaricomycetes
- Order: Russulales
- Family: Russulaceae
- Genus: Pseudoxenasma; K.H.Larss. & Hjortstam (1976)

Type species
- Pseudoxenasma verrucisporum K.H.Larss. & Hjortstam (1976)

= Pseudoxenasma =

Genus of fungi

Pseudoxenasma is a fungal genus in the family Russulaceae, described in 1976. The genus is monotypic and contains the single species Pseudoxenasma verrucisporum, found in Sweden.

The original description reads: "Fruitbody resupinate, effused, thin, hymenium more or less ceraceous, generally smooth. Hyphal system monomitic with the individual hyphae indistinct. Always with sulphocystidia i.e. with positive reaction to sulphovanilline as in Gloeocystidiellum. The cystidia are provided with globose apical appendices (schizopapilles according to Boidin and Lanquetin). Basidia clavate, in most cases pleurobasidiate, with four sterigmata. Spores verrucose, thickwalled, broadly ellipsoid to subglobose in side view and with strong amyloid reaction."
