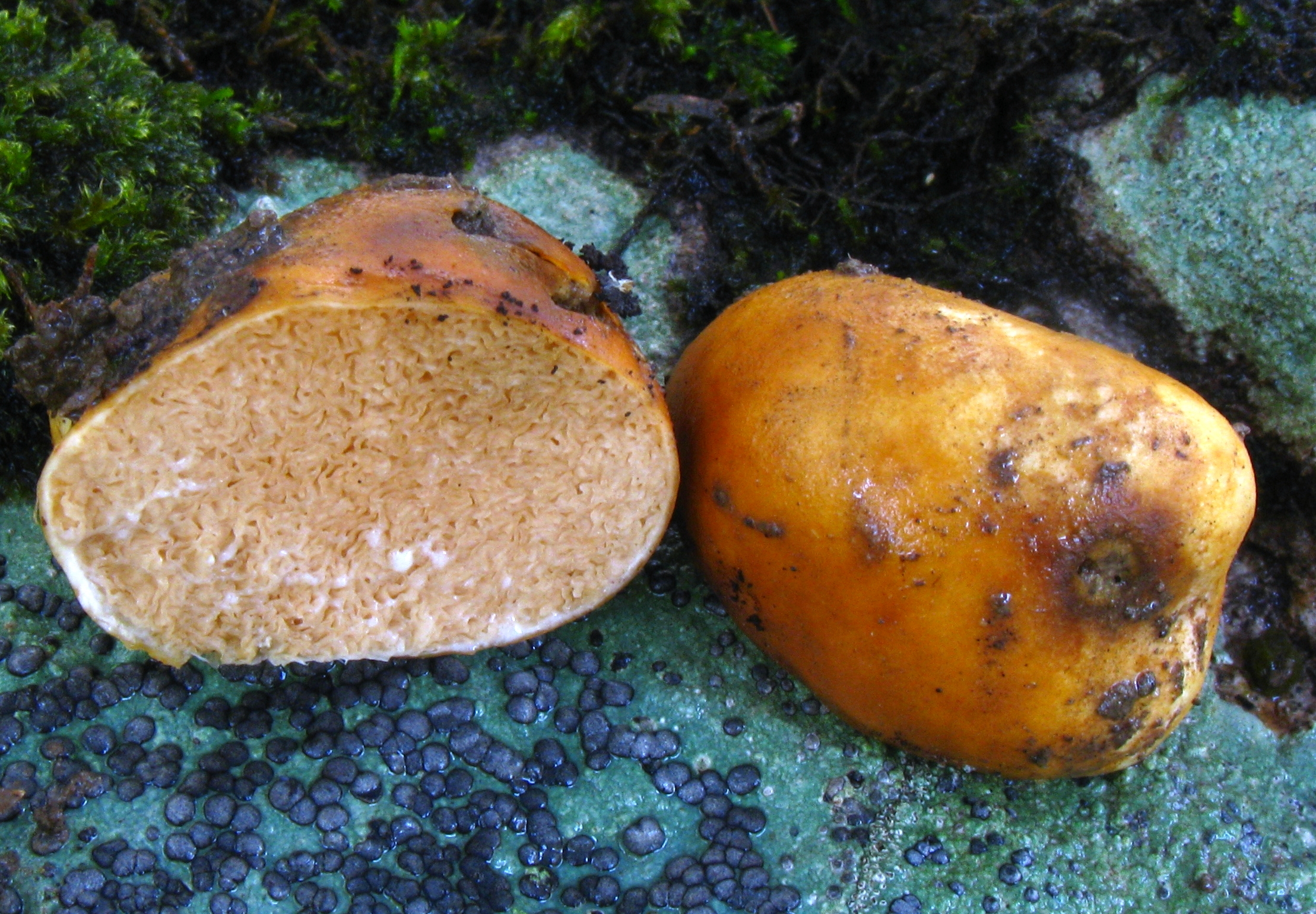

Scientific classification
- Kingdom: Fungi
- Division: Basidiomycota
- Class: Agaricomycetes
- Order: Russulales
- Family: Russulaceae
- Genus: Lactarius
- Species: L. cinnabarinus

Binomial name
- Lactarius cinnabarinus Singer & A.H.Sm. (1960) Somrau & M.E. Sm. (2024)

Synonyms
- Zelleromyces cinnabarinus Singer & A.H. Sm. (1960); Lactarius taedae A.G.S. Silva-Filho, Sulzbacher & Wartchow (2018)

= Lactarius cinnabarinus =

Species of glebal mushroom

Lactarius cinnabarinus
- Mycological characteristics
- Glebal hymenium
- No distinct cap
- Hymenium attachment is not applicable
- Lacks a stipe
- Spore print is white
- Ecology is mycorrhizal
- Edibility is unknown

Lactarius cinnabarinus is a North American gasteroid fungus species in the family Russulaceae with a cinnabar-red peridium. Up until 2024 it was considered to be the type species of Zelleromyces, and like other members of its genus, it was considered after phylogenetic studies that it should be transferred to the genus Lactarius. It was described from a collection made under pine in Jackson, Louisiana.

== See also ==
List of Lactarius species
