= Gastrolactarius =

Scientific classification
- Kingdom: Fungi
- Division: Basidiomycota
- Class: Agaricomycetes
- Order: Russulales
- Family: Russulaceae
- Genus: Gastrolactarius; R.Heim ex J.M.Vidal 2005

Type species
- Gastrolactarius densus (R.Heim) J.M.Vidal (2005)

Genus of fungi

Gastrolactarius is a genus of gasteroid fungi in the family Russulaceae . Although currently valid, this taxon is very likely a synonym of Lactarius.

== Species ==
- Gastrolactarius camphoratus
- Gastrolactarius crassus
- Gastrolactarius crichtonii
- Gastrolactarius densus
- Gastrolactarius denudatus
- Gastrolactarius desjardinii
- Gastrolactarius hepaticus
- Gastrolactarius lactarioides
- Gastrolactarius parvus
- Gastrolactarius saylorii
- Gastrolactarius textus
- Gastrolactarius variegatus
