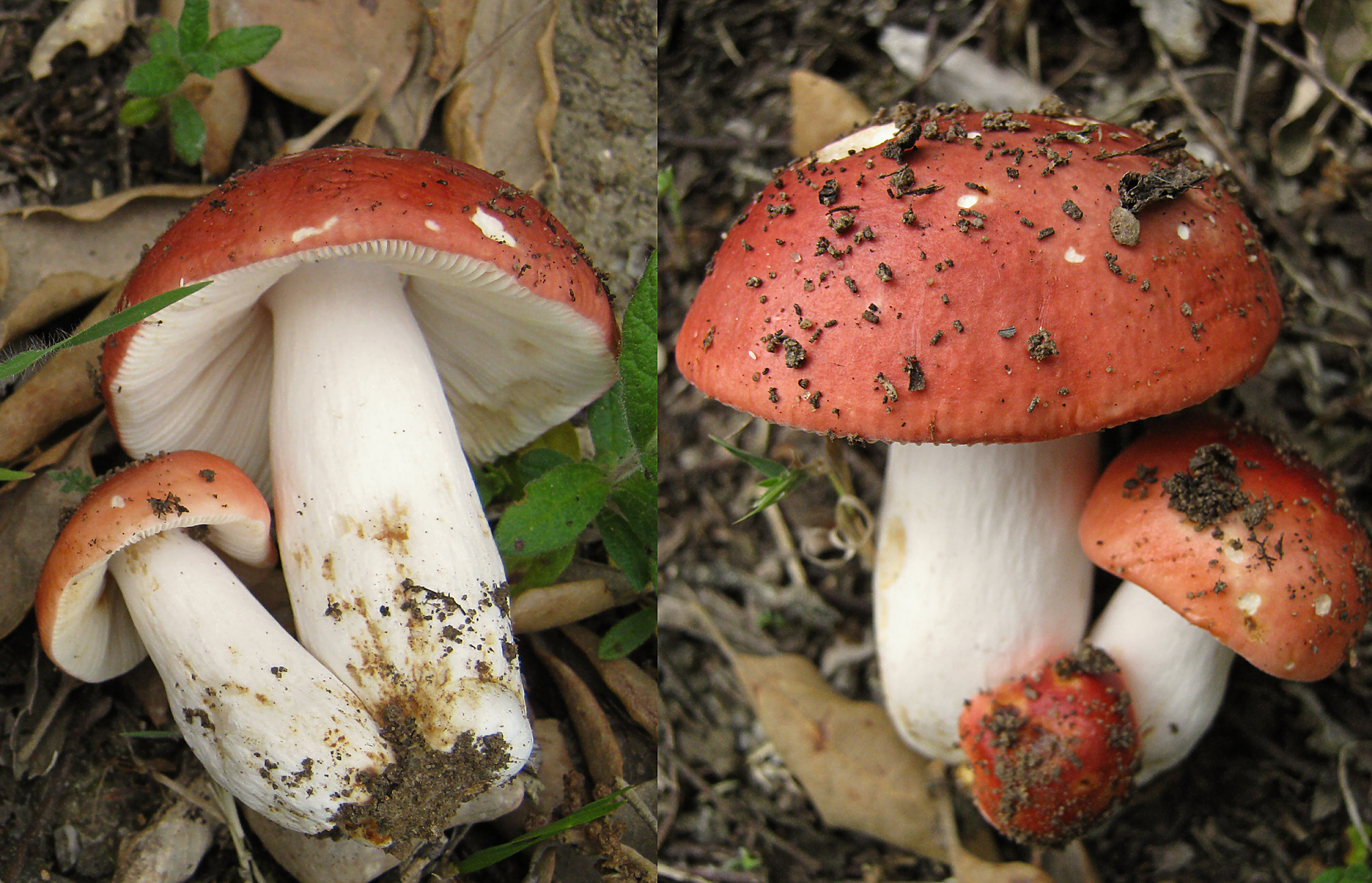

Scientific classification
- Domain: Eukaryota
- Kingdom: Fungi
- Division: Basidiomycota
- Class: Agaricomycetes
- Order: Russulales
- Family: Russulaceae
- Genus: Russula
- Species: R. rosea

Binomial name
- Russula rosea Pers. (1796)

Synonyms
- Russula lepida Fr.

= Russula rosea =

Species of fungus

Russula rosea (synonym Russula lepida), known as the rosy russula, is a north temperate, commonly found mushroom of the large "brittlegill" genus Russula.

The cap is convex when young, later flat, mostly bright cinnabar to carmine red; often with yellow spots and up to 10 cm in diameter. The gills are pale straw-yellow, brittle, and occasionally with a red edge at the rim of the cap. The spores are pale-cream. The stem is usually flushed carmine, but can be pure white. The flesh is hard and bitter-tasting; some consider it edible, others inedible.

This mushroom is commonly found in coniferous forests or near beech trees.

== Similar species ==
The rare Russula pseudointegra is distinguished by its hot-tasting flesh. Red-stemmed forms of R. rosea could also be confused with Russula xerampelina, but the latter has softer flesh and no woody flavour.

== See also ==
- List of Russula species
