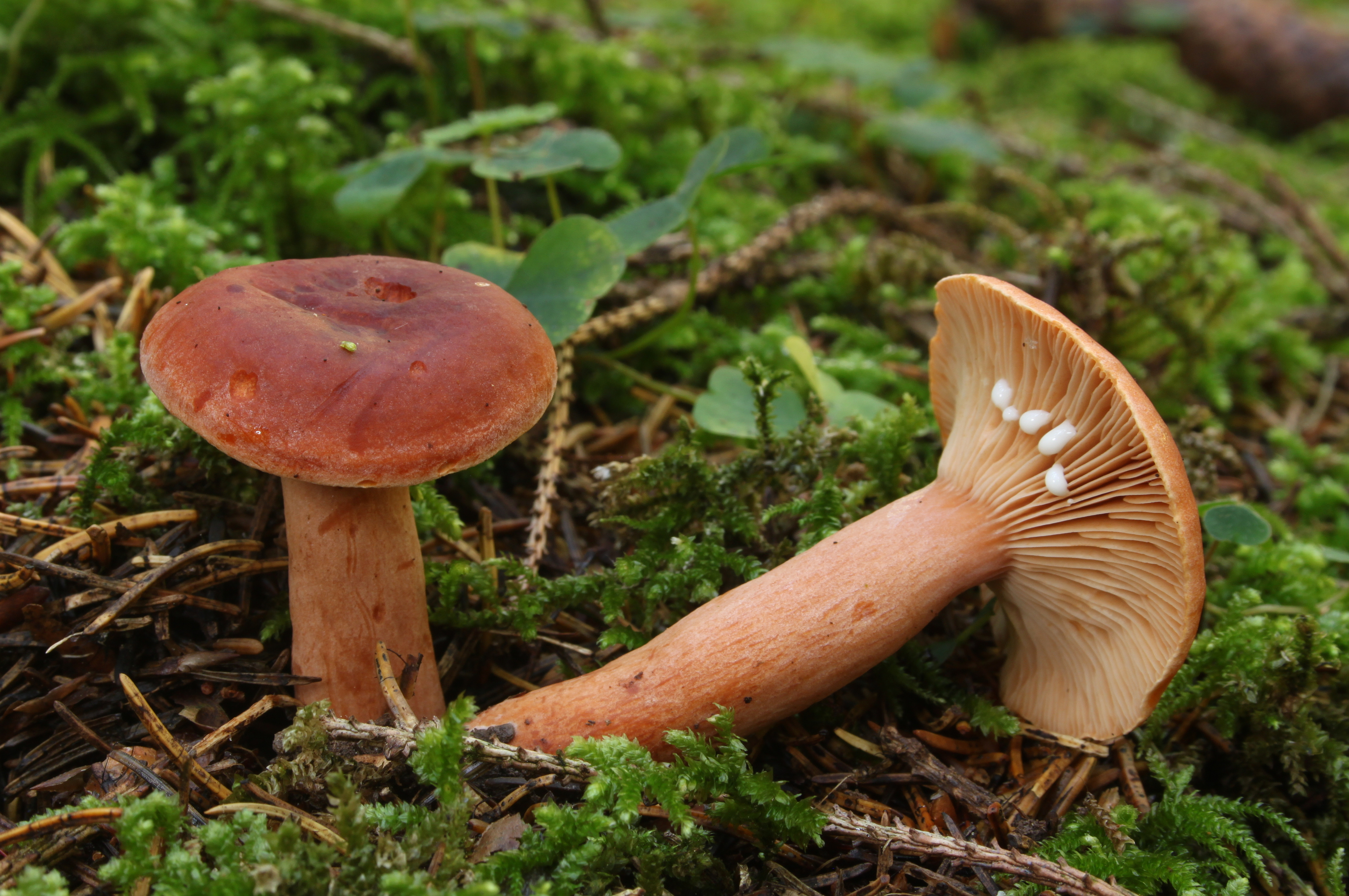

Scientific classification
- Domain: Eukaryota
- Kingdom: Fungi
- Division: Basidiomycota
- Class: Agaricomycetes
- Order: Russulales
- Family: Russulaceae
- Genus: Lactarius
- Species: L. aurantiacus

Binomial name
- Lactarius aurantiacus (Pers.: Fr.) Gray
- Range of Lactarius aurantiacus in Europe

= Lactarius aurantiacus =

Fungus species

Lactarius aurantiacus Mycological characteristics
- Gills on hymenium
- Cap is depressed
- Hymenium is adnate
- Stipe is bare
- Spore print is cream
- Ecology is mycorrhizal
- Edibility is not recommended

Lactarius aurantiacus is a species of mushroom in the family Russulaceae and is commonly referred to as the orange milkcap. The common English name "orange milkcap" can also refer to other similar species of fungi, such as Lactarius subflammeus.

== Description ==
L. aurantiacus is a mycorrhizal mushroom that varies in colour from a vibrant orange to a light orangish brown. Its cap is convex with a slightly depressed centre and ranges from 1 to 5 centimetres in diameter. The texture of it is said to be smooth and glossy. The mushroom grows from 2.5cm to 6.5cm tall.

Additionally, like all other species of milkcaps, L. aurantiacus produces a milky latex when bruised or cut.

The mushroom's gills are spaced apart slightly and are a light pink or orange in colour. Its stem is approximately 5-12mm in diameter and has no ring.

== Habitat and distribution ==
This species of macro fungi is mainly found in Europe but has also been sighted in certain parts of Asia and North America. They grow either alone or in small groups.

L. aurantiacus grows in acidic soils near pine, spruce, and sometimes birch trees in forests. It creates a mycorrhizal relationship with one or more of the trees that are around it.

== Similar species ==
- Lactarius fulvissimus
- Lactarius subflammeus (also commonly called "orange milkcap")
