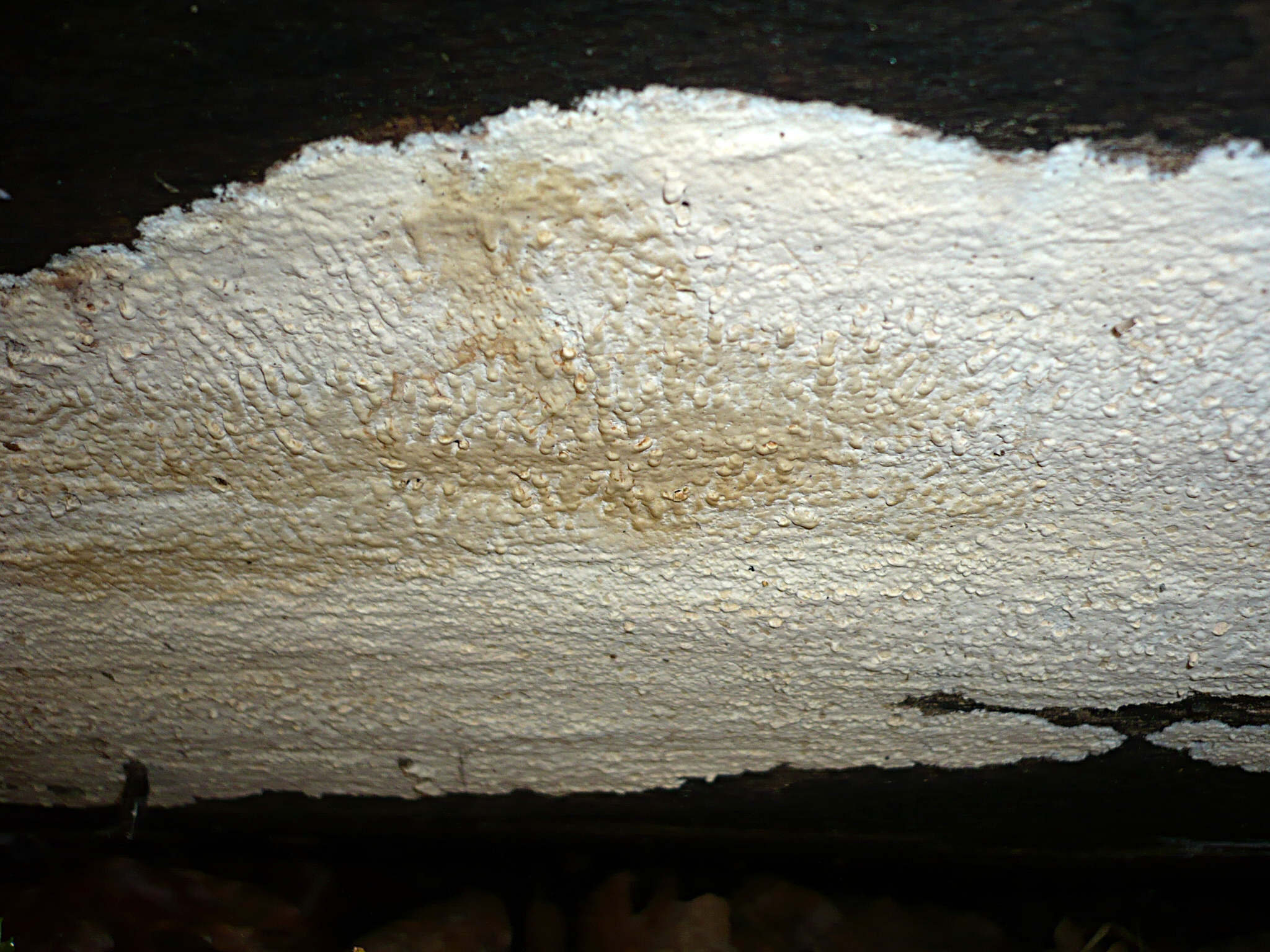
- Gloeocystidiellum porosum

Scientific classification
- Domain: Eukaryota
- Kingdom: Fungi
- Division: Basidiomycota
- Class: Agaricomycetes
- Order: Russulales
- Family: Gloeocystidiellaceae; Jülich
- Genus: Gloeocystidiellum; Donk

Type species
- Gloeocystidiellum porosum (Berk. & M.A. Curtis) Donk

Species
- ca. 30 species

= Gloeocystidiellum =

Genus of fungi

Gloeocystidiellum is a single genus of fungi in the monotypic Gloeocystidiellaceae family. Its species form crust-like, smooth fruitbodies. It is probably polyphyletic and may be restricted to the group around the type species G. porosum.

== Species ==
- Gloeocystidiellum aspellum
- Gloeocystidiellum bisporum
- Gloeocystidiellum clavuligerum
- Gloeocystidiellum compactum
- Gloeocystidiellum debile
- Gloeocystidiellum fimbriatum
- Gloeocystidiellum fistulatum
- Gloeocystidiellum flammeum
- Gloeocystidiellum formosanum
- Gloeocystidiellum heimii
- Gloeocystidiellum inconstans
- Gloeocystidiellum irpiscescens
- Gloeocystidiellum kenyense
- Gloeocystidiellum leucoxanthum
- Gloeocystidiellum luridum
- Gloeocystidiellum marianum
- Gloeocystidiellum odontoides
- Gloeocystidiellum porosellum
- Gloeocystidiellum porosum
- Gloeocystidiellum purpureum
- Gloeocystidiellum rajchenbergii
- Gloeocystidiellum sinuosum
- Gloeocystidiellum subsimile
- Gloeocystidiellum sulcatum
- Gloeocystidiellum tabacinum
- Gloeocystidiellum triste
- Gloeocystidiellum tropicale
- Gloeocystidiellum turpe
- Gloeocystidiellum vesiculosum
- Gloeocystidiellum zawitense
- Gloeocystidiellum lojanense
