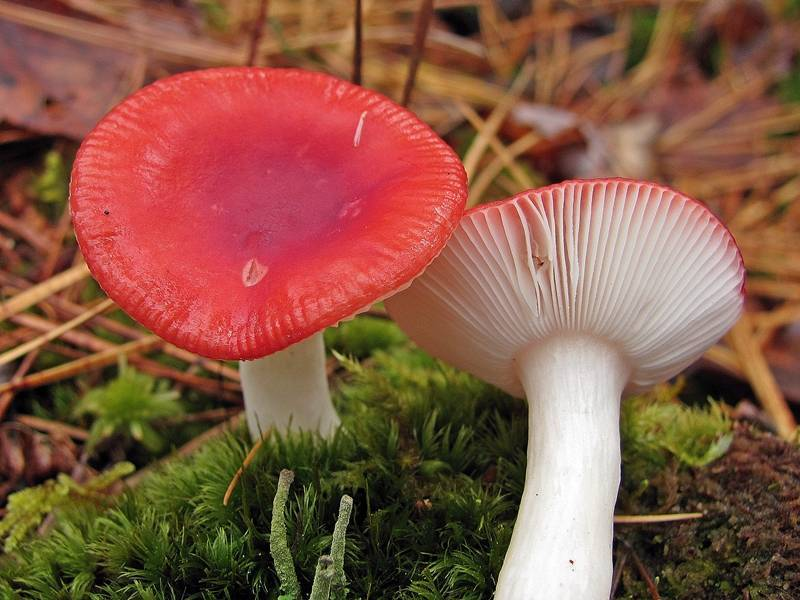
- Russula emetica

Scientific classification
- Kingdom: Fungi
- Division: Basidiomycota
- Class: Agaricomycetes
- Order: Russulales
- Family: Russulaceae; Lotsy (1907)

Type genus
- Russula Pers. (1796)

Genera
- Boidinia; Gloeopeniophorella; Lactarius^{1}; Lactifluus; Multifurca; Pseudoxenasma; Russula^{2}^{1}including Arcangeliella, Gastrolactarius, and Zelleromyces^{2}including Cystangium, Gymnomyces, Elasmomyces, Martellia, and Macowanites

Synonyms
- Asterosporaceae Moreau (1954) (nom. illeg.); Elasmomycetaceae Locq. ex Pegler & T.W.K.Young (1979); Lactariaceae Gäumann (1926)

= Russulaceae =

Family of fungi in the order Russulales

The Russulaceae are a diverse family of fungi in the order Russulales, with roughly 1,900 known species and a worldwide distribution. They comprise the brittlegills and the milk-caps, well-known mushroom-forming fungi that include some edible species. These gilled mushrooms are characterised by the brittle flesh of their fruitbodies.

In addition to these typical agaricoid forms, the family contains species with fruitbodies that are laterally striped (pleurotoid), closed (secotioid or gasteroid), or crust-like (corticioid). Molecular phylogenetics has demonstrated close affinities between species with very different fruitbody types and has discovered new, distinct lineages.

An important group of root-symbiotic ectomycorrhizal fungi in forests and shrublands around the world includes Lactifluus, Multifurca, Russula, and Lactarius. The crust-forming genera Boidinia, Gloeopeniophorella, and Pseudoxenasma, all wood-decay fungi, have basal positions in the family.

== Taxonomy ==
The family Russulaceae was first validly named in 1907 by Dutch botanist Johannes Paulus Lotsy, who included three genera: Russula, Lactarius, and Russulina (now considered a synonym of Russula). He emphasised features such as the granular flesh, thick gills, spiny spores, and milky hyphae and rounded cells (sphaerocytes). A prior usage of "Russulariées" by French mycologist Ernst Roze in 1876 is not considered a valid publication, since the proper Latin termination for the family rank specified in article 18.4 of the nomenclature code was not used.

Synonyms of Russulaceae include: Ernst Albert Gäumann's Lactariaceae (1926), Fernand Moreau's Asterosporaceae (1953), and David Pegler and Thomas Young's Elasmomycetaceae (1979). The latter family was proposed to contain species with statismosporic (non-forcibly discharged) and symmetric spores, including the gasteroid genera Elasmomyces, Gymnomyces, Martellia, and Zelleromyces. Calonge and Martín reduced the Elasmomycetaceae to synonymy with the Russulaceae when molecular analysis confirmed the close genetic relationship between the gasteroid and agaricoid genera.

=== Placement of the family ===
Historically, the gilled mushrooms of the family Russulaceae were classified with other gilled species in the order Agaricales, but microscopical studies of spore and fruitbody flesh features raised the possibility that they were more closely related with certain "lower fungi" presenting nongilled, crust-like fruitbodies. The use of molecular phylogenetics confirmed that these morphologically diverse fungi form a distinct lineage, first termed the "russuloid clade" and today classified as order Russulales in the class Agaricomycetes. The family's sister group within the order appears to be the crust-like Gloeocystidiellaceae.

=== Internal systematics ===
- - - - - Lactarius
        - Multifurca
      - Russula
    - Lactifluus
  - Boidinia
  - Gloeopeniophorella
  - Pseudoxenasma

Phylogeny of the Russulaceae; dashed lines indicate uncertain placement.

A 2008 molecular phylogenetic study clarified the relationships among the mushroom-forming species of the family. The authors demonstrated the existence of four distinct lineages of gilled mushrooms, which led to the description of Multifurca as a new genus separated from Russula and the segregation of Lactifluus from Lactarius.

Genera with closed fruitbodies within the family are form taxa instead of natural groups: Arcangeliella, Gastrolactarius, and Zelleromyces are phylogenetically part of Lactarius, while Cystangium, Elasmomyces, Gymnomyces, Macowanites, and Martellia belong to Russula. Nevertheless, some of these genus names are still in use, as many of the concerned species have not yet formally been synonymised with Lactarius or Russula.

The crust-like genera Boidinia, Gloeopeniophorella, and Pseudoxenasma, formerly placed in the Corticiaceae or Gloeocystidiellaceae, are now classified in the Russulaceae and basal to the clade of mushroom-forming species described above. Studies have so far failed to clearly circumscribe and place these genera within the family. Boidinia in its current extent is polyphyletic, with some species not falling into the Russulaceae.

=== Species diversity ===
Altogether, the Russulaceae comprise around 1,900 accepted species. Russula is by far the largest genus with c. 1,100 species, Lactarius has c. 550, Lactifluus c. 120, Boidinia 13, Multifurca 6, Gloeopeniophorella 6, and Pseudoxenasma 1 species. Closed-fruitbody species not yet synonymised with Lactarius or Russula (see above) account for some 150 species.

New species in the Russulaceae continue to be described from various regions, such as the US, Guyana, Brazil, Patagonia, Togo, Sri Lanka, or Thailand. It has been estimated that the real number of Russula species in North America alone (currently around 400 described) might be as high as 2000. Cryptic species may increase true diversity: some morphologically well-defined species, especially in Lactifluus, have been shown to actually encompass several phylogenetic species.

== Description ==
=== Macroscopic characteristics ===
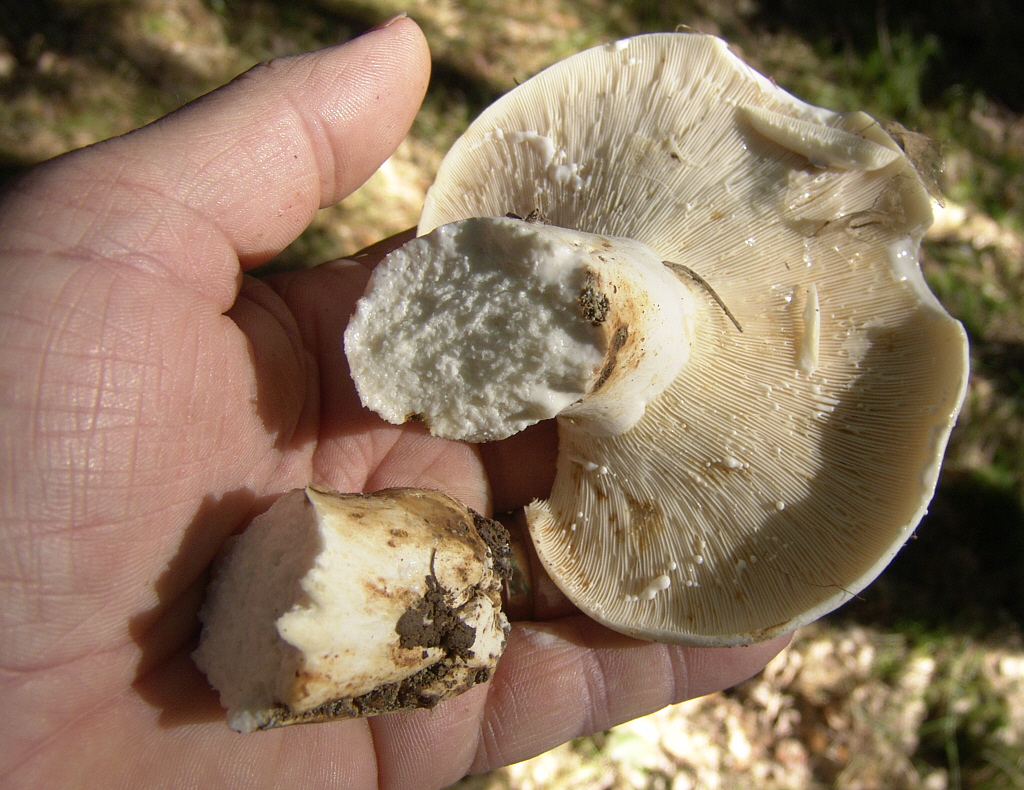
Lactifluus vellereus (Russulaceae)

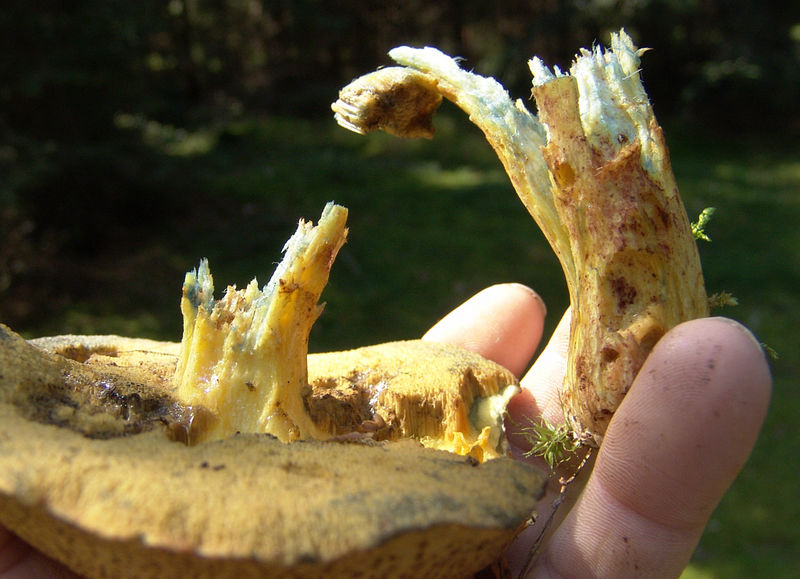
Suillus variegatus (Suillaceae)

Comparison of brittle flesh texture in Russulaceae and the more fibrous flesh found in most other fungi

Three major types of fruitbodies occur in the Russulaceae: agaricoid and pleurotoid forms with a cap, gills, and a stipe; forms with closed (gasteroid) or partially closed (secotioid) fruitbodies, and corticioid, crust-like forms.

The agaricoid species in Lactarius, Lactifluus, Multifurca, and Russula are readily distinguished from other gilled mushrooms by the consistency of their flesh, which is granular, brittle and breaks easily, somewhat like a piece of chalk. Russulaceae never have a volva, but a partial veil can be found in some tropical species. Gills are adnate to decurrent, and the colour of the spore print ranges from white to ochre or orange (with the brown-spored Lactarius chromospermus as an exception).

Caps can be dull to very colourful, the latter especially in Russula; their size ranges from 17 mm diameter or less in Russula campinensis to 30 cm (12 in) in Lactifluus vellereus. Concentrically ringed (zonate) caps occur in all Multifurca and several Lactarius species. Laterally striped (pleurotoid) fruitbodies exist in some, mainly tropical Lactifluus and Russula species. Taste is a distinguishing characteristic in many species, from mild to very acrid. A conspicuous feature of the "milk-caps" in Lactarius, Lactifluus, and Multifurca furcata is the latex or "milk" their fruitbodies exude when bruised.

The secotioid and gasteroid species in Lactarius and Russula are derived from agaricoid forms. Secotioid species still have a stipe but the cap does not open fully, while in gasteroid species, fruitbodies are completely closed and the stipe is reduced; in both cases, the spore-bearing structure is made up of convoluted gills that are more or less crowded and anastomosed. These closed-fruitbody species represent a continuum of secotioid to gasteroid, above-ground to below-ground fruitbodies, with spores forcibly discharged or not. Secotioid or gasteroid Lactarius exude latex just like their agaricoid relatives.

The corticioid species of Boidinia, Gloeopeniophorella, and Pseudoxenasma develop crust-like fruitbodies with a smooth, porous, or flaky surface and grow on tree logs or dead branches.

Morphological variety of Russulaceae
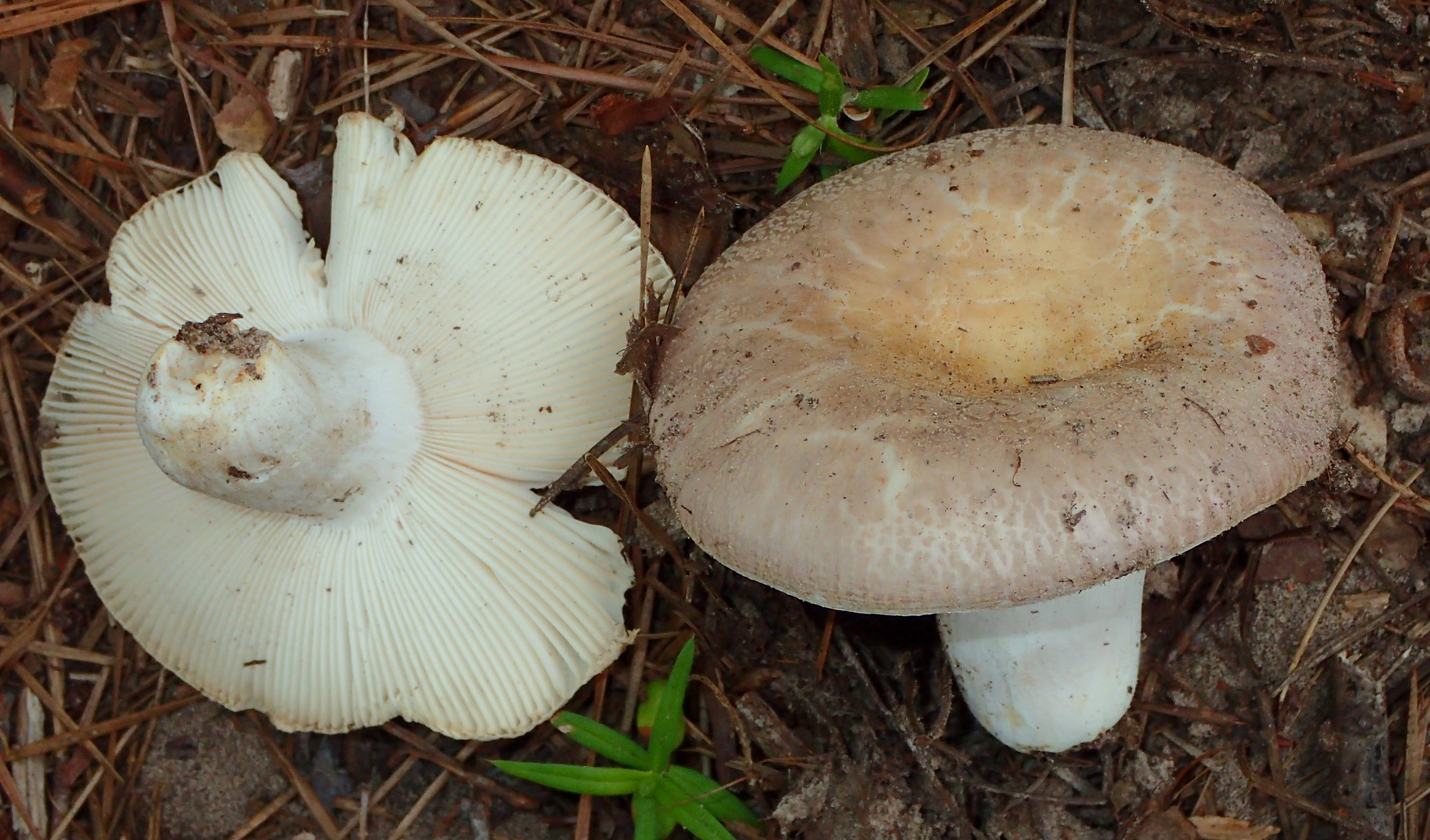
Agaricoid: Russula crustosa

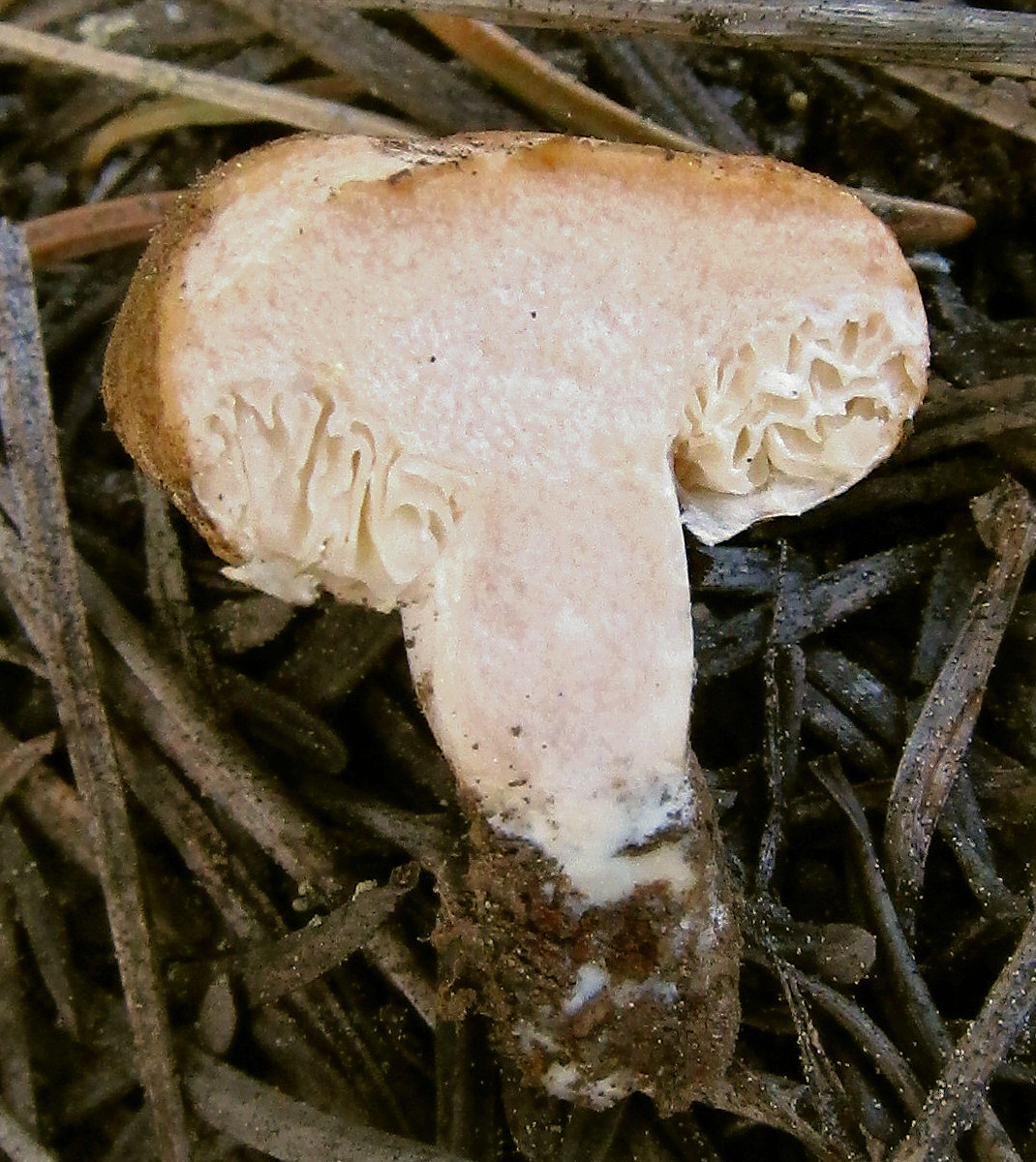
Secotioid: Lactarius crassus

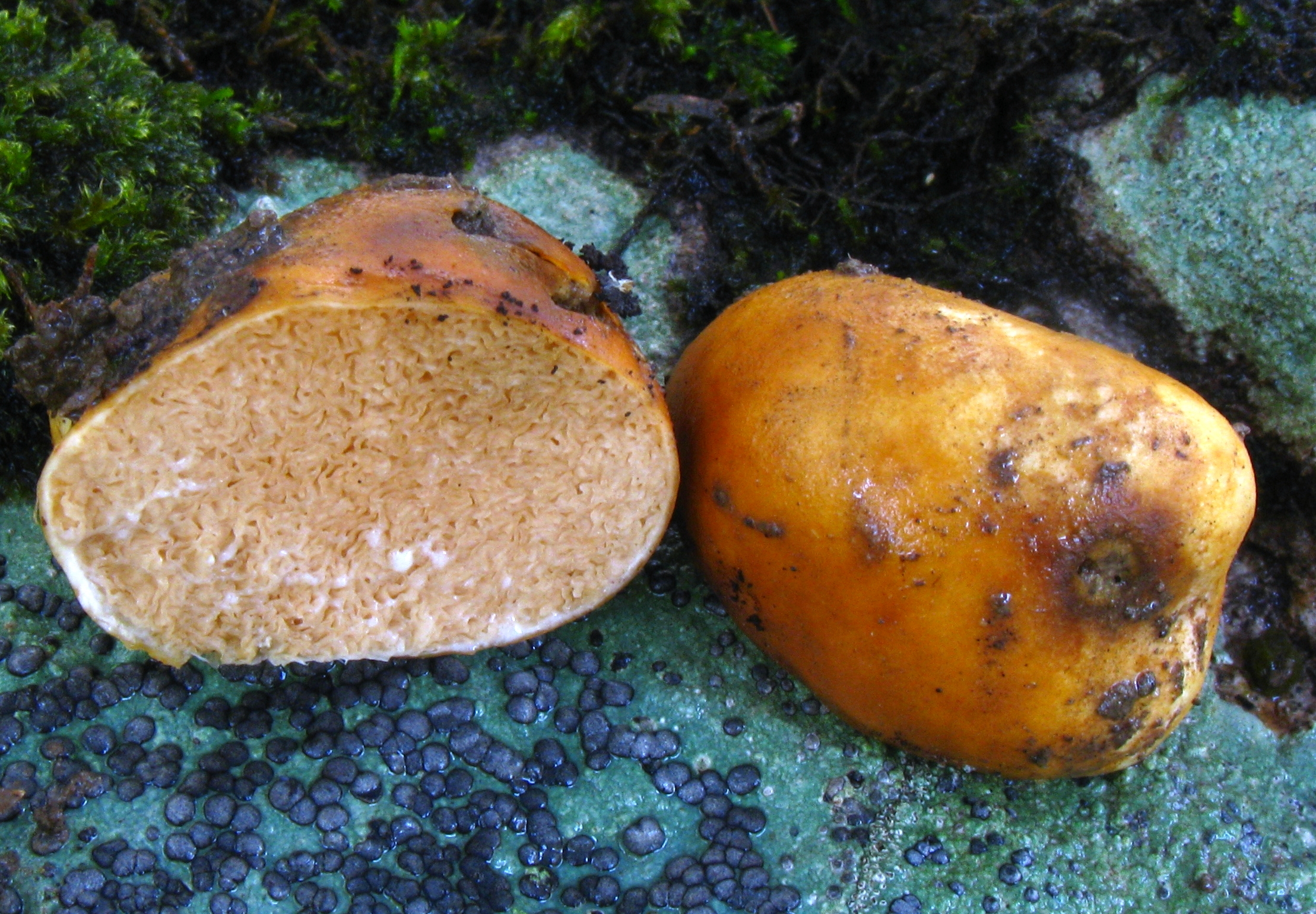
Gasteroid: Lactarius cinnabarinus

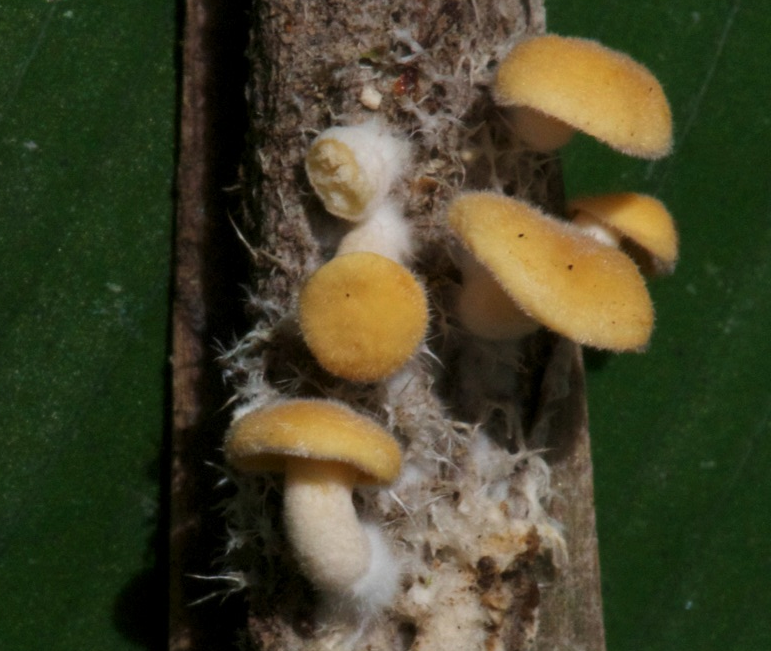
Pleurotoid: unidentified Lactifluus from French Guiana

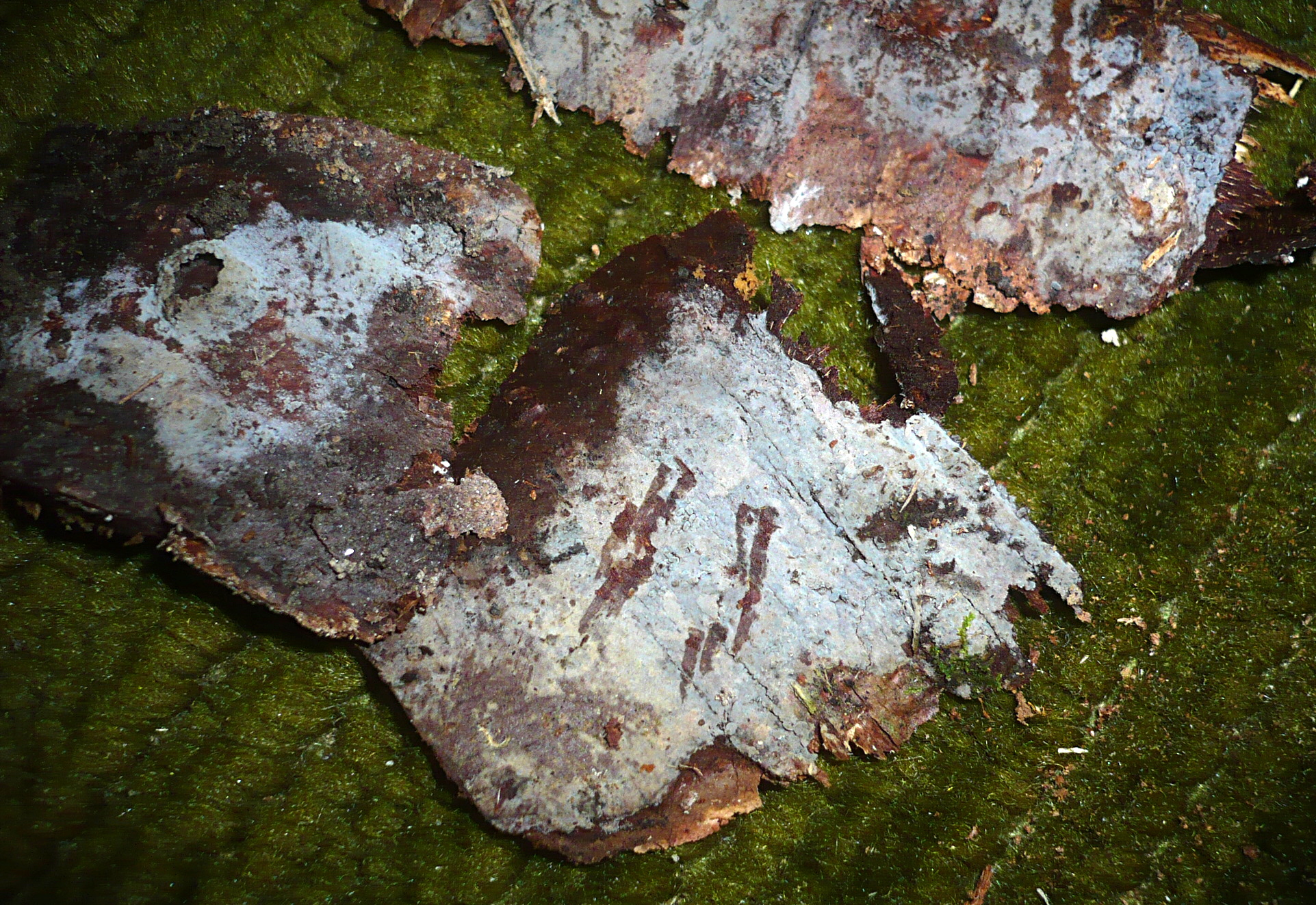
Corticioid: Pseudoxenasma verrucisporum

=== Microscopic characteristics ===
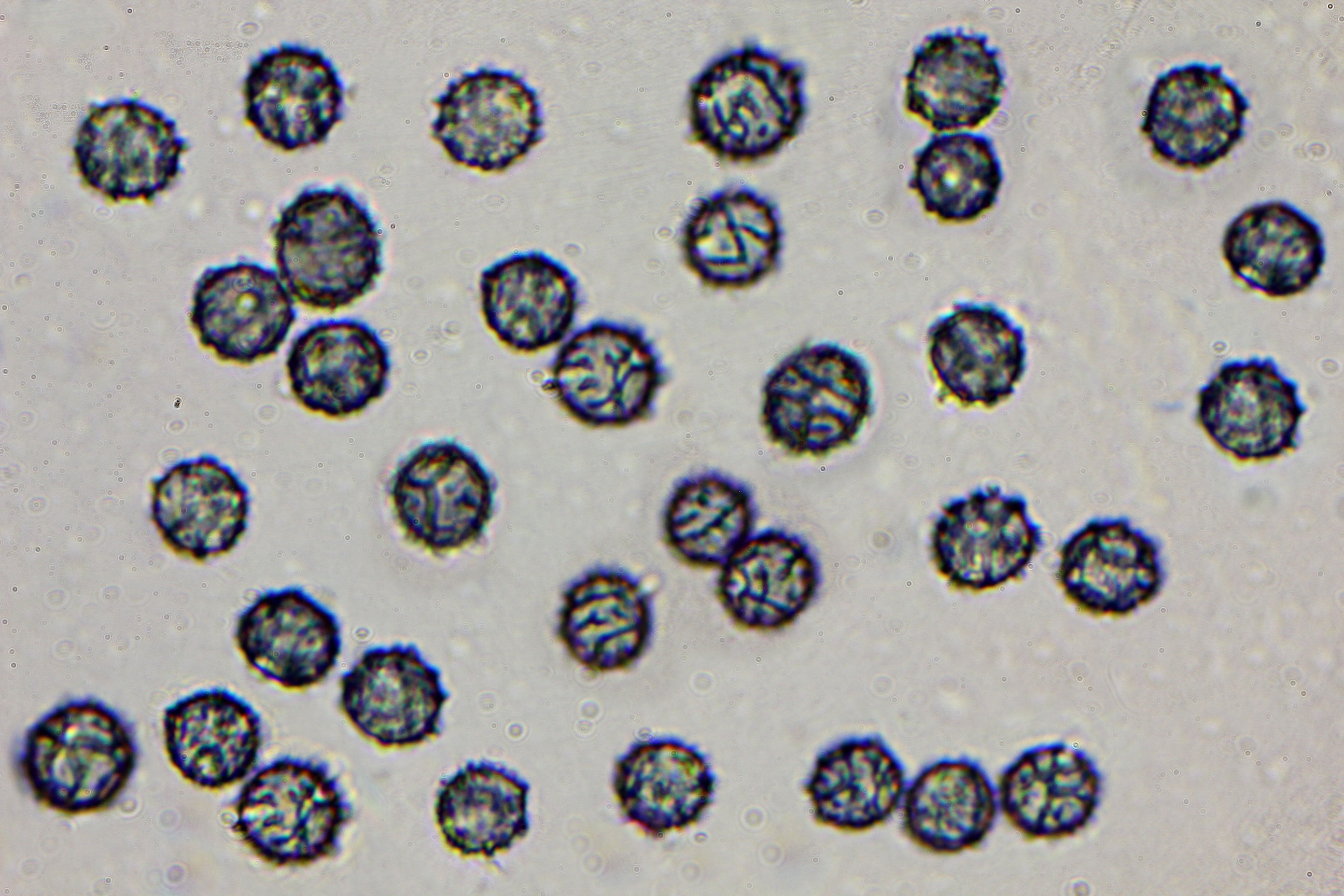
Spores of Lactarius rubidus, showing ornamentation with a blue, amyloid stain reaction that is typical for Russulaceae

All Russulaceae, including the corticioid species, are characterised by spherical to elliptic basidiospores with a faint to very distinct (e.g. warty, spiny, or crested) ornamentation that stains bluish-black with Melzer's reagent (an amyloid stain reaction). Basidia (spore-bearing cells) are usually club-shaped and four-spored. Russulaceae species do not have clamp connections.

Characteristic cells with an oily content (gloeocystidia) are found in the hymenium. In Russulaceae, these show a positive colour reaction when treated with sulfoaldehydes (sulfovanillin is mostly used). They are also present in the hyphal sheath of ectomycorrhizal roots colonised by Russulaceae.

The feature responsible for the brittle fruitbody structure in the mushroom-forming species are globular cells, called sphaerocytes or sphaerocysts, that compose the flesh (trama) alongside the usual hyphae. Sometimes, these cells are clustered, and the position and arrangement of these clusters differs among genera.

Another particular trama cell type are lactiferous hyphae (also lactifers). These are hyphae carrying the "milk" or "latex" exuded by the milk-caps; they react positively with sulfoaldehydes, form an abundantly branched system in the trama and end as pseudocystidia in the hymenium. In general, only Lactarius, Lactifluus and Multifurca furcata possess lactifers. In Russula, similar hyphae can sometimes be observed in the trama, but these are not as abundantly branched as real lactifers and do not extend into the hymenium as pseudocystidia. This traditional distinction line between the "milk-caps" and Russula is however less evident in some tropical species presenting intermediate states.

=== Genera distinction ===
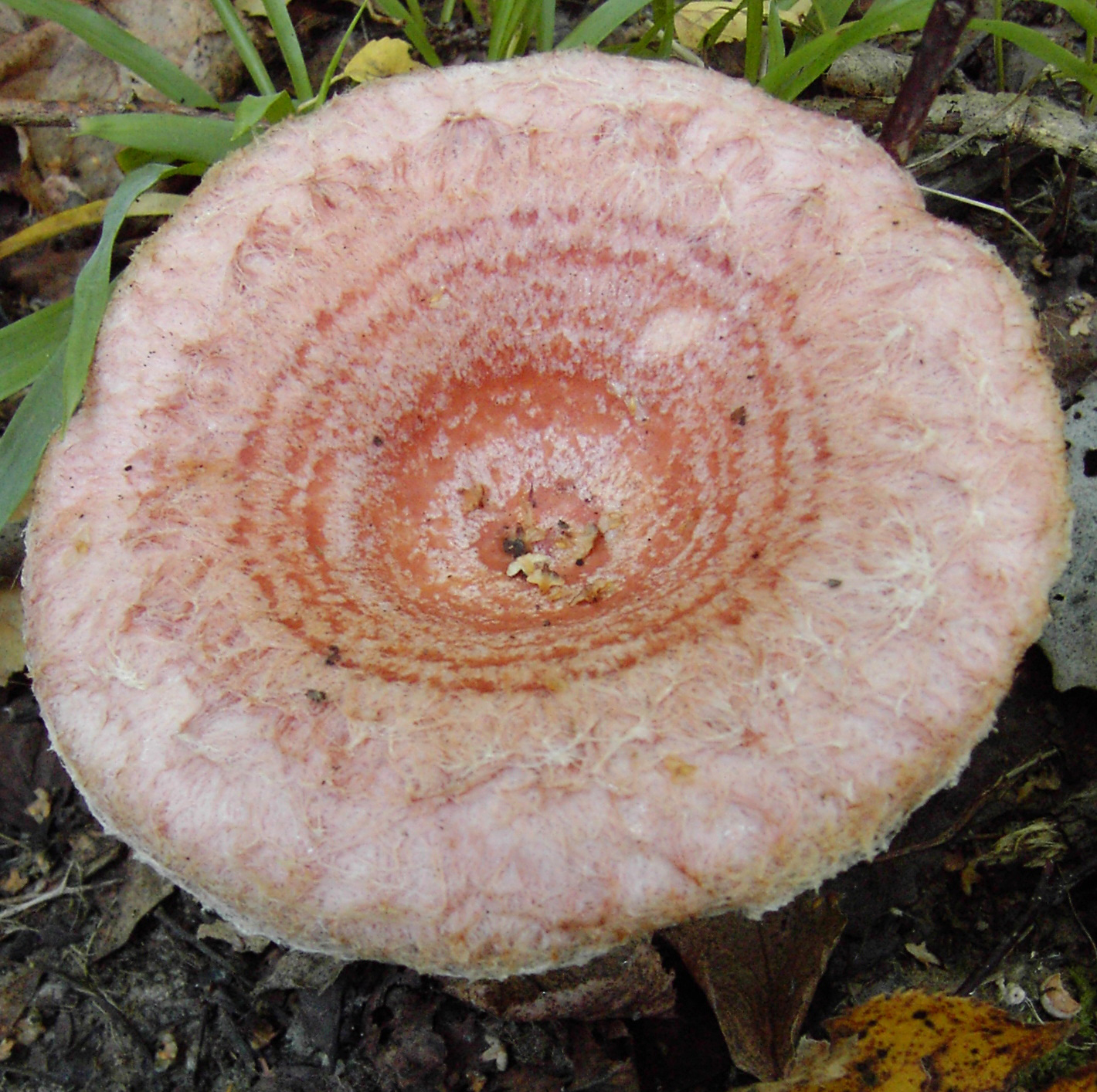
Lactarius torminosus

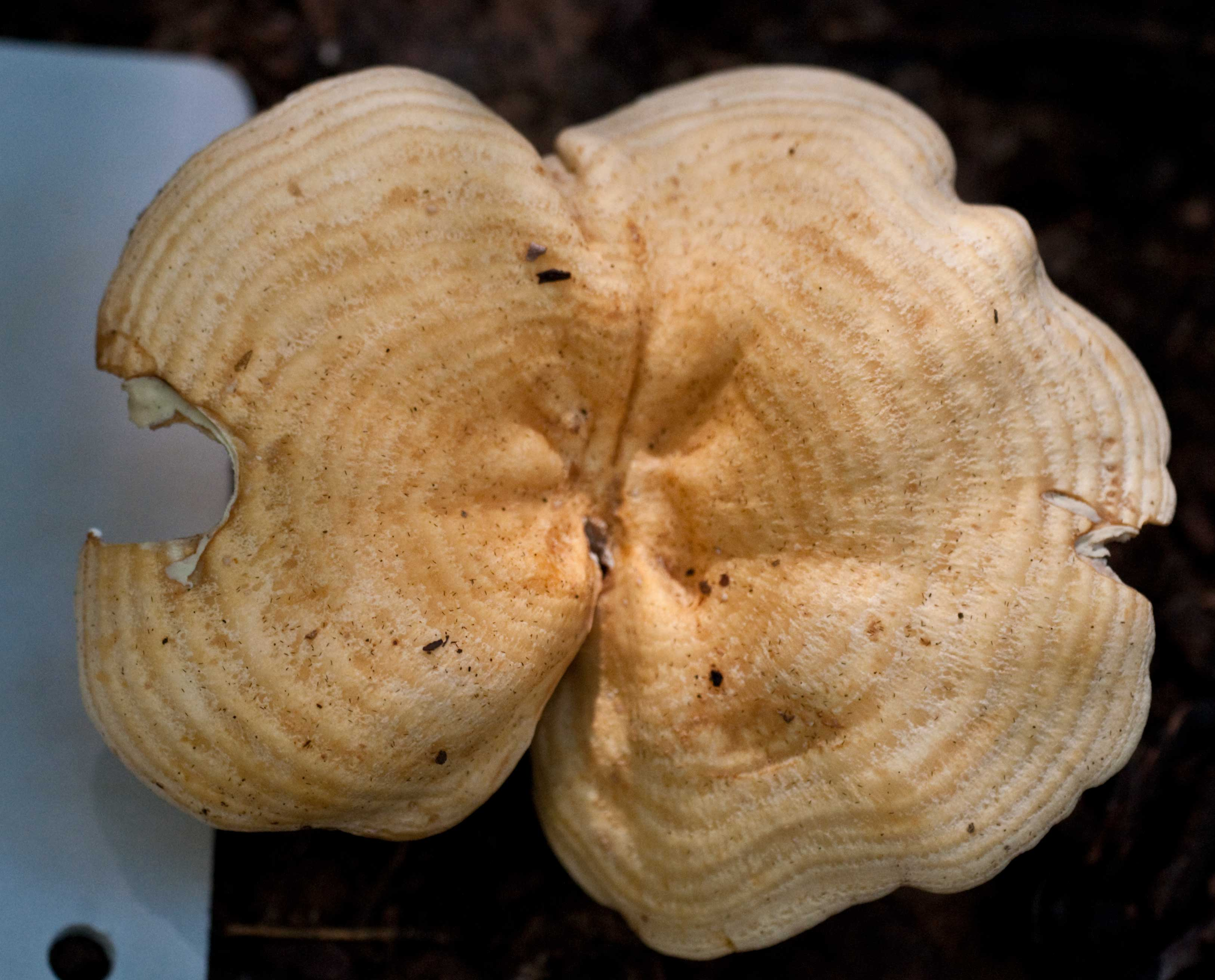
Unidentified Multifurca species

Zonate caps are a feature of several species of Russulaceae in Lactarius and Multifurca.

Some characteristics of the mushroom-forming genera (marked with * below) can be less obvious or absent in tropical species. Distinguishing between Lactarius and Lactifluus based on morphology alone is quite difficult, as clear synapomorphies for both genera have yet to be identified. Most field guides treat the two genera together, often because Lactifluus is not yet recognised as a separate genus.

- Boidinia: corticioid; loose texture; surface smooth, with pores, or flaky; spores spherical with spiny to warty ornamentation. Note that the genus is polyphyletic and needs to be redefined.
- Gloeopeniophorella: corticioid; surface almost smooth; hyphae without clamp connections; thick-walled cystidia (metuloids) and gloeocystidia present; spores with wrinkled (rugose) ornamentation.
- Lactarius: agaricoid or gasteroid; exuding latex*; caps sometimes zonate, viscose or glutinate, but never annulate; rarely thick-walled cells in cuticles of the cap (pileipellis) and the stipe (stipitipellis) and sphaerocytes in the gills.
- Lactifluus: agaricoid or pleurotoid; exuding latex*; caps never zonate, viscose or glutinate, but sometimes annulate; thick-walled cells in cap and stipe cuticles; often sphaerocytes in the gill trama.
- Multifurca: agaricoid; caps zonate (also visible in cut through trama); gills regularly forked; only M. furcata exuding latex; spore print orange; spores very small; microscopical trama and hymenium features very variable.
- Pseudoxenasma: corticioid; wax-like texture; gloeocystidia with spherical apical appendices; basidia developing laterally on hyphae (pleurobasidia); spores broadly ellipsoid to roughly spherical, with warty ornamentation.
- Russula: agaricoid, gasteroid or pleurotoid; never exuding latex; caps often brightly coloured with stipe and gills much paler; caps not zonate*; spore print white, cream, ochre, or orange; no true lactiferous hyphae*; sphaerocytes abundant in gill, cap, and stipe trama.

== Distribution ==
The Russulaceae as a whole have a worldwide distribution, but patterns differ among genera. Russula is the most widespread, found in North, Central and South America, Europe, temperate and tropical Asia, Africa, and Australasia. It is the only Russulaceae genus that occurs in the Nothofagus zone of temperate South America.

Lactarius is mainly known from the north temperate zone, but some species also occur in tropical Asia and Africa. Lactifluus has a more tropical distribution than Lactarius, with most species known from tropical Africa, Asia, South America, and Australasia, but some also occurring in the north temperate zone. Multifurca is the rarest among the four mushroom genera, known only from some punctual records in North and Central America, Asia, and Australasia.

Species of Lactarius, Lactifluus, and Russula have repeatedly been introduced with trees outside their native range: An overview article lists introductions in Chile, Argentina, Uruguay, Brazil, the US, Great Britain, the Faroe Islands, South Africa, China, Thailand, and New Zealand.

Among the corticioid genera, Pseudoxenasma is only known from Europe. In contrast, Boidinia species have been found in Europe, Taiwan, and Japan, and Gloeopeniophorella species in North America, South America, Europe, West Africa, Taiwan, Australia, and New Zealand.

== Ecology ==
=== Ectomycorrhizal symbiosis ===
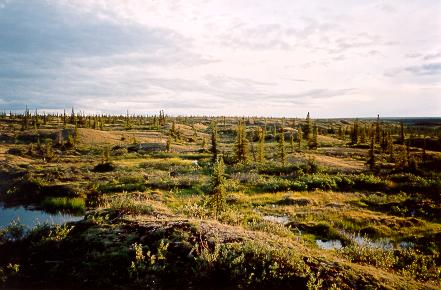
Arctic tundra, Canada

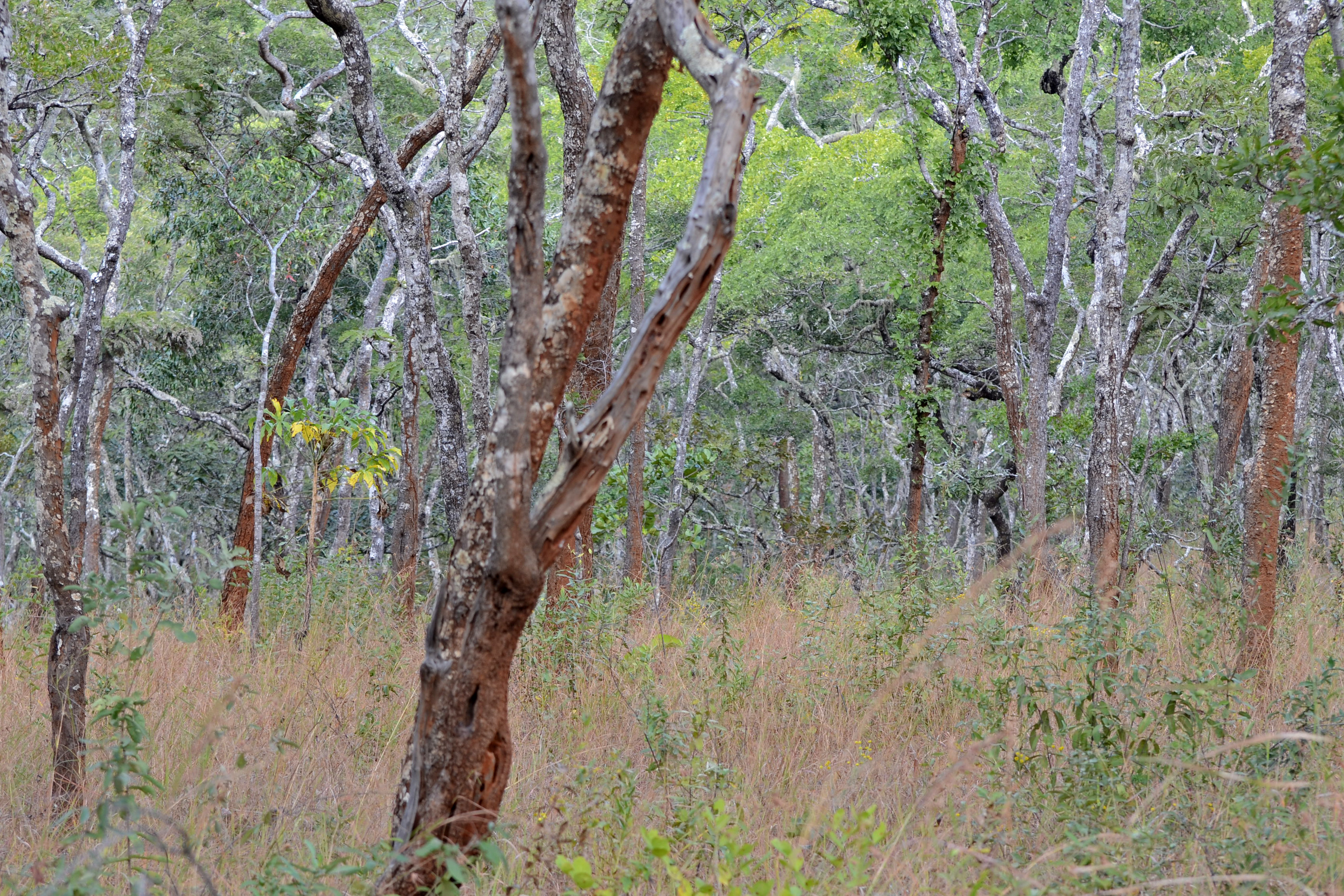
Miombo woodland, Malawi

Ectomycorrhizal Russulaceae are found in a wide variety of habitats ranging from high latitudes to the tropics.

The genera Lactarius, Lactifluus, Multifurca and Russula form a mutualistic ectomycorrhizal root symbiosis with trees and shrubs, exchanging mineral nutrients for photosynthetic sugar. They are one of several fungal lineages that have evolved such a lifestyle and are sometimes referred to as the "/russula-lactarius" clade in the scientific literature. Worldwide, they are one of the most frequently encountered lineages on ectomycorrhizal roots. While some tropical species were initially believed to be parasitic, the observation that species fruiting on tree trunks do form ectomycorrhiza in tropical Guyana supports the view of an exclusively symbiotic lineage.

Associations are known with several plant families. In the Northern Hemisphere, these are essentially the well-known ectomycorrhizal trees and shrubs in the Betulaceae, Fagaceae, Pinaceae and Salicaceae, but in arctic and alpine habitats, Russulaceae also associate with Bistorta vivipara (Polygonaceae), Kobresia (Cyperaceae), and Dryas octopetala (Rosaceae), ectomycorrhizal plants untypic in their respective families. In the tropics, known plant partners include Dipterocarpaceae, Fabaceae, Nyctaginaceae, Phyllanthaceae, Polygonaceae (Coccoloba), Sarcolaenaceae, and the gymnosperm Gnetum gnemon, and in the Southern Hemisphere, Nothofagaceae, Myrtaceae (Eucalyptus and Leptospermum), and Rhamnaceae (Pomaderris). Some Russulaceae are quite specialised in their ectomycorrhizal symbiosis, such as Lactarius and Russula species that only grow with Cistus shrubs in the Mediterranean basin.

The different plant partners are reflected in the wide variety of habitats worldwide. Ectomycorrhizal Russulaceae have been observed in arctic and alpine tundra, boreal and alpine forest, north temperate forest, mires, mediterranean forests and scrub (maquis), miombo woodland, tropical lowland rainforest, tropical cloud forest, tropical dry forest, Australian eucalypt woodlands, and south temperate forests. Where they are introduced, they typically grow in plantations of their native host species, e.g. with pine in South Africa, Eucalyptus in Thailand, or birch in New Zealand.

=== Other types of mycorrhiza ===
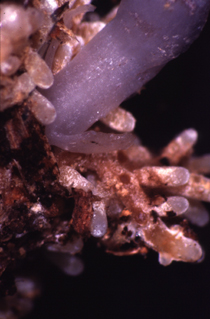
Root tips of the myco-heterotrophic plant Monotropa uniflora, with a mycorrhizal sheath formed by Russula brevipes

Some of the ectomycorrhizal Russulaceae are also involved in other types of root symbioses with plants.

A mutualistic association similar to ectomycorrhiza but with some hyphae penetrating into the plant root cells, termed arbutoid mycorrhiza, is formed by Russulaceae with shrubs of the genera Arbutus and Arctostaphylos, both in subfamily Arbutoideae of the Ericaceae.

Some Russulaceae are associated with myco-heterotrophic plants of the Ericaceae subfamily Monotropoideae, forming monotropoid mycorrhiza. This is an epiparasitic relationship, where the heterotrophic plant ultimately derives its carbon from the primary, ectomycorrhizal plant partner of the fungus. The association is often very specific, with the heterotrophic plants only associating with selected fungus partners, including Russulaceae.

Russulaceae are also an important group of orchid mycorrhizal fungi. This symbiosis is mutualistic in the case of green orchids, but a partly or fully epiparasitic relationship in the case of myco-heterotrophic and mixotrophic orchids, respectively. In some cases, the association with Russulaceae is, as in monotropoid mycorrhiza, very specific: the Mediterranean orchid Limodorum abortivum predominantly associates with Russula delica and closely related species; in Corallorhiza maculata, different genotypes of the same species have distinct Russula partners.

=== Wood decay species ===
The corticioid species in Boidinia, Gloeopeniophorella, and Pseudoxenasma are saprotrophic, wood-degrading fungi that develop on dead wood. Their early-branching positions in the phylogeny suggests this has been the ancestral trophic mode of the Russulaceae, and that the mycorrhizal lifestyle (see above) evolved later. The saprotrophic nature of these species has been questioned, based on the observation that other inconspicuous, crust-forming fungi are ectomycorrhizal; a subsequent author reaffirms nevertheless that "[n]one of the corticioid species in the family shows any sign of mycorrhizal activity."

=== Hypogeous fruiting ===
Hypogeous fruitbodies, or fruitbodies developing below ground, occur in Lactarius and Russula and have previously been considered as distinct genera (see Systematics and taxonomy: Internal systematics). As such species are especially diverse in some warm and dry regions, e.g. in Spain, California, or Australia, below-ground fruiting has been interpreted as an adaptation to drought. However, hypogeous Russulaceae are also known from cold temperate regions and tropical rainforest. The fact that hypogeous species in the Russulaceae do not form their own lineages but are scattered in Russula or Lactarius shows that this type of fruiting evolved several times. It is believed that these changes are evolutionarily quite recent.

=== Parasites and predators ===
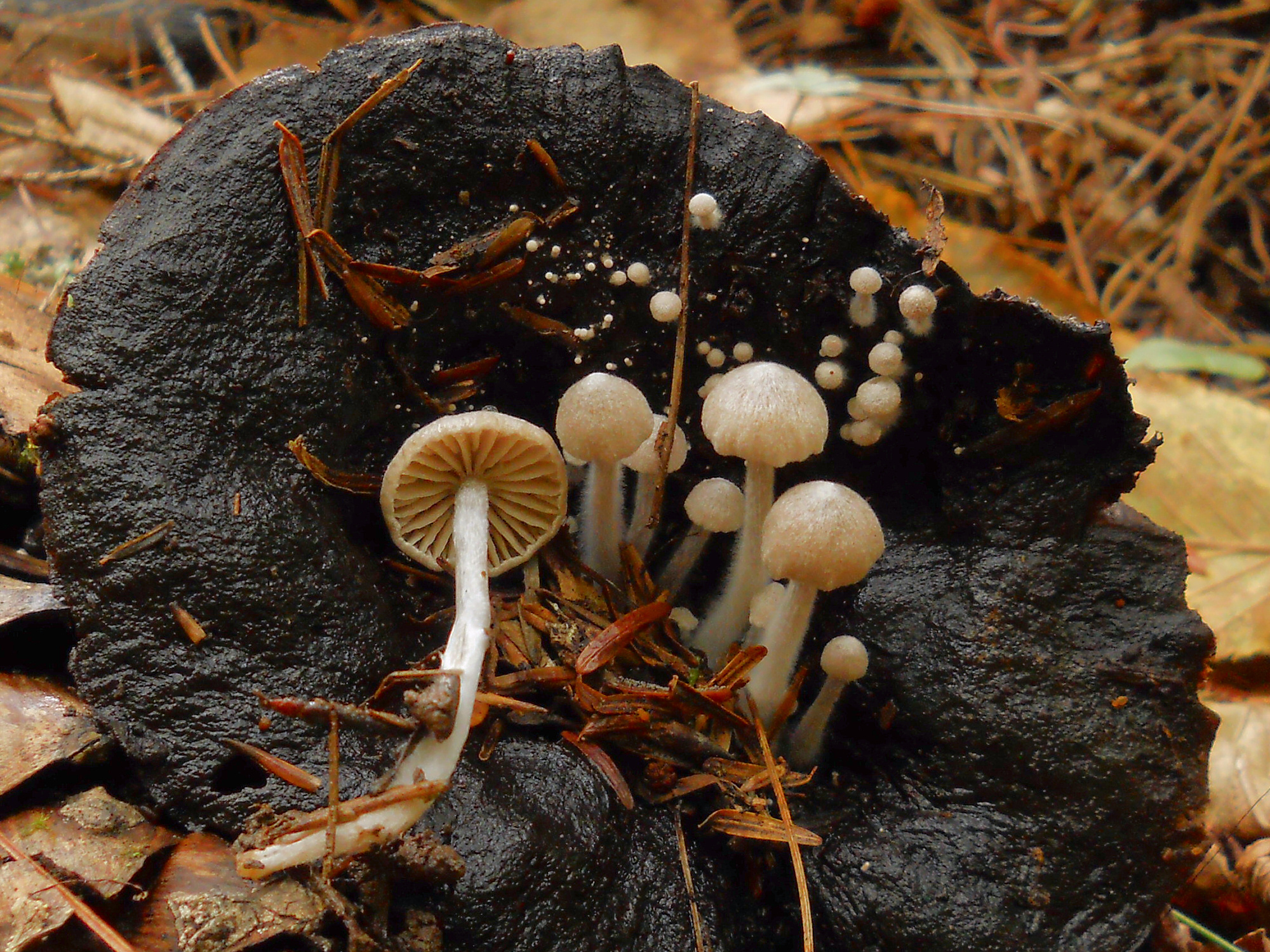
Asterophora parasitica grows on rotting Russulaceae fruitbodies.

Russulaceae fruitbodies are subject to parasitisation by other fungi. The genus Asterophora develops on old fruitbodies of the mushroom species in the family, as does Dendrocollybia racemosa on at least Russula crassotunicata. Fruitbodies of Lactifluus or Russula species otherwise hot-tasting and unpalatable are regarded as choice edibles in North America when infected by the "lobster mushroom" Hypomyces lactifluorum. Heterotrophic plants, including orchids or monotropoids, also parasitise ectomycorrhizal Russulaceae and their plant partners – see above, Other types of mycorrhiza.

Fungi of this family have been recorded as a main food of the pleasing fungus beetle Tritoma angulata.

=== Threats and conservation ===
As with most fungi, little information is available on the threat of extinction for Russulaceae species, and they have not been assessed in the International Union for the Conservation of Nature's Red List. However, national lists contain some species of Lactarius, Lactifluus and Russula, indicating that they have small populations and are endangered, e.g. in Great Britain, Switzerland, the Czech Republic, and New Zealand.

Although data on Russulaceae themselves are scarce, more is known about the habitats they occur in, especially for the ectomycorrhizal species which depend on their host plants: Several of these habitats are affected by loss or degradation, such as peatlands, Mediterranean forests and scrub or tropical African dry woodland. Similarly, dead wood, the habitat of the corticioid Russulaceae, is rare in many exploited forests and needs special management.

Recent studies have found some traditional Russulaceae species to comprise several cryptic species (see Systematics and taxonomy: Species diversity). This may imply that distribution range and population size for each of such distinct species are smaller than previously thought.

== Edibility ==
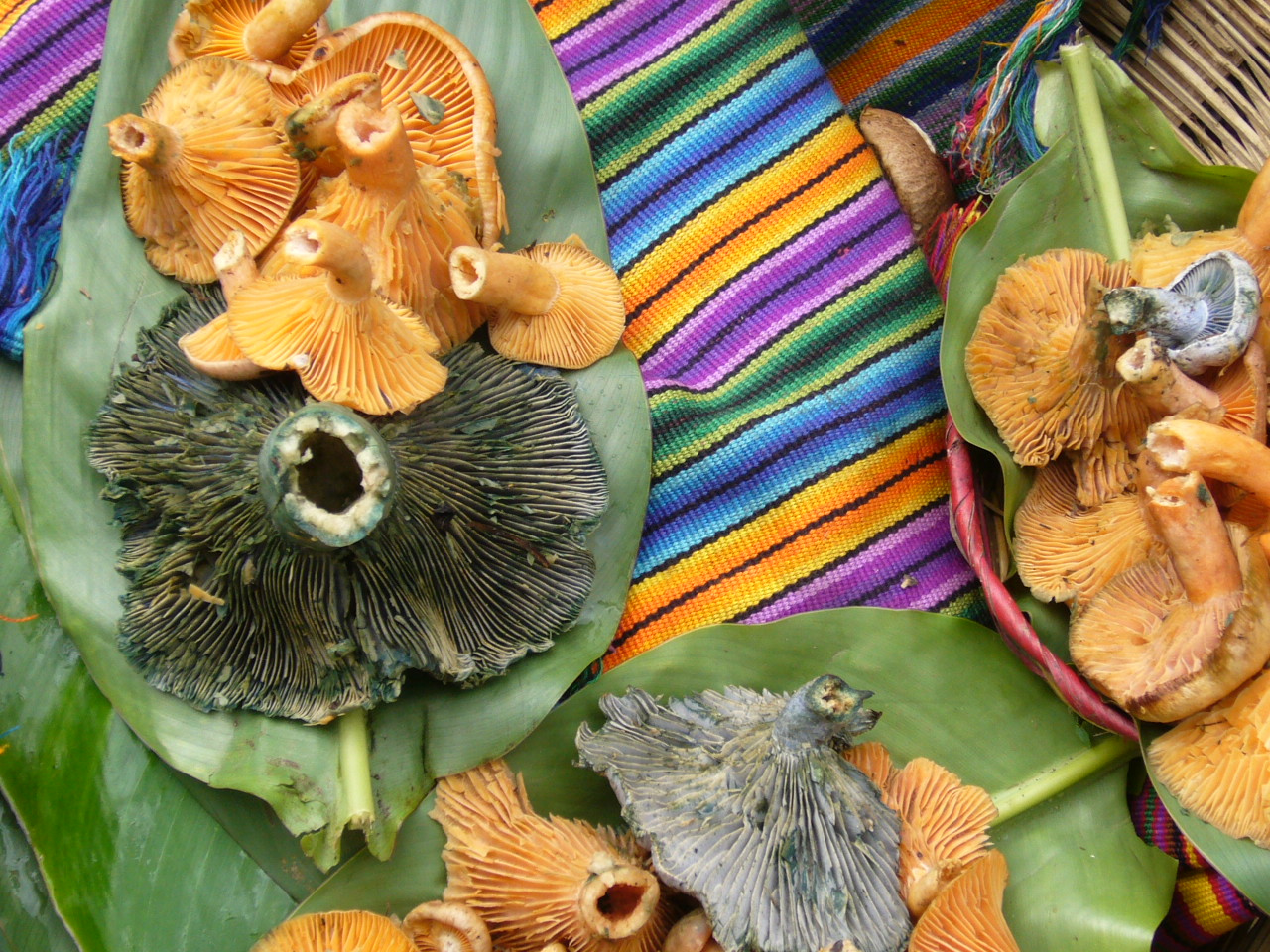
Lactarius indigo and another Lactarius species for sale on a market in Guatemala

Several species of Lactarius, Lactifluus and Russula are valued as excellent edible mushrooms. This is the case for example for the north temperate species Lactarius deliciosus, Lactifluus volemus, or Russula vesca, and other species are popular in other parts of the world, e.g. Lactarius indigo in Mexico, or Lactifluus edulis in tropical Africa. Some species, like Russula vesca, can even be eaten raw. The brittle texture of Russula fruitbodies makes them different from other mushrooms and is not appreciated by some.

Several species have a hot to very acrid taste and can cause gastrointestinal symptoms. Despite this, such species are eaten in some regions, e.g. Lactarius torminosus in Finland or Russia. Often, they are parboiled or pickled to make them palatable, and sometimes, they are used as spice, for example Russula emetica in Eastern Europe. Some species are however truly poisonous: the East Asian and North American Russula subnigricans causes rhabdomyolysis and is potentially lethal, and Lactarius turpis from Eurasia contains a mutagenic substance.

Cultivation of edible Russulaceae, as in other ectomycorrhizal fungi, is challenging, since the presence of host trees is required. In spite of this difficulty, the European Lactarius deliciosus has been successfully grown in "mushroom orchards" in New Zealand.

== Chemistry ==
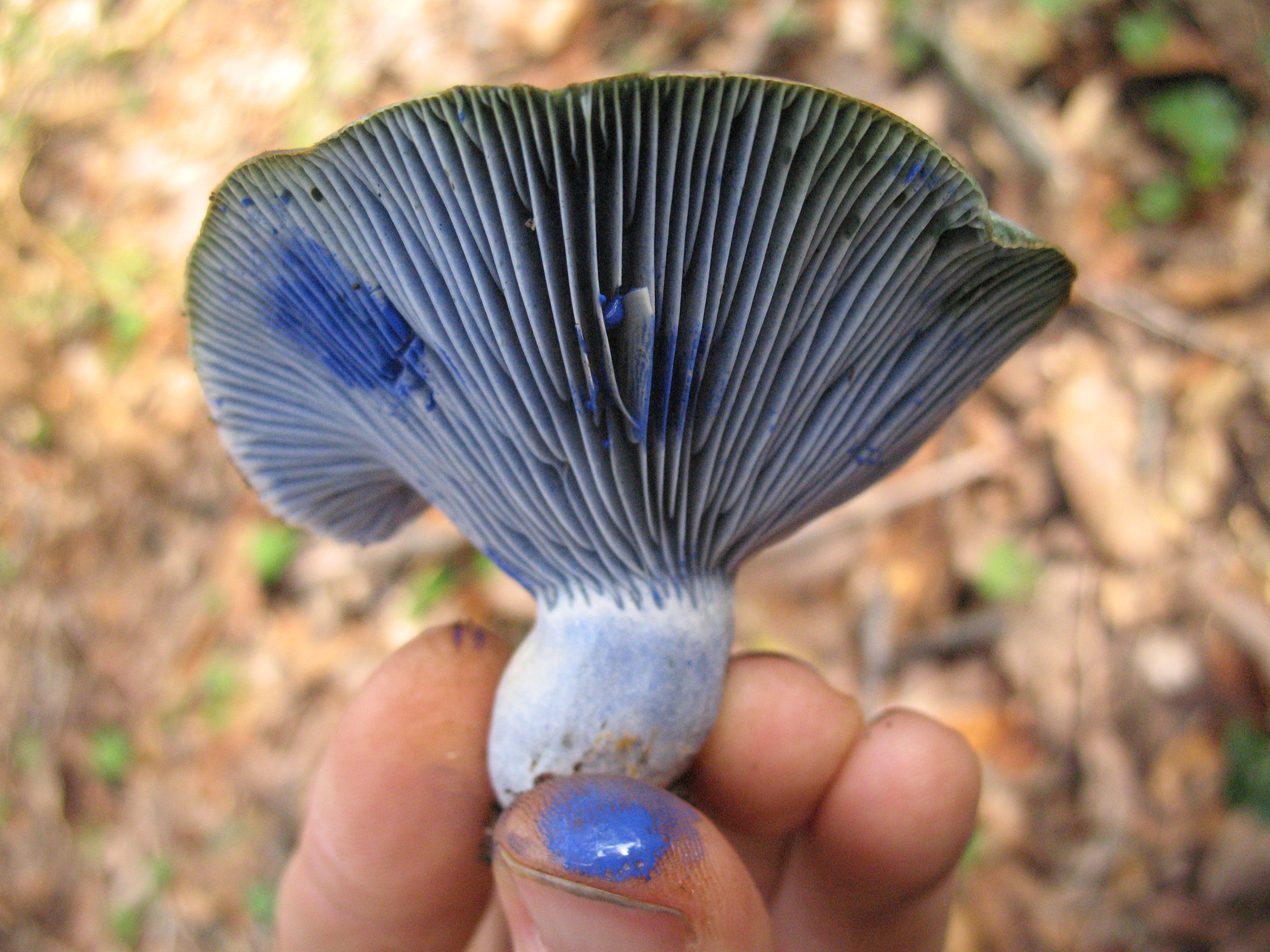
Lactarius indigo contains a striking blue pigment.

Fruitbodies of Russulaceae have been the subject of natural product research, and different classes of organic compounds have been isolated from them.

Aroma compounds are responsible for the particular odour or taste in some species, e.g. sotolon in the fenugreek-smelling Lactarius helvus, or the similar quabalactone III in Lactarius rubidus which causes a maple syrup-like odor in dried specimens. Pigments have been isolated from brightly coloured species, e.g. (7-isopropenyl-4-methylazulen-1-yl)methyl stearate from the blue Lactarius indigo or russulaflavidin and a derivative from the yellow Russula flavida. Some Russula species contain pigmented pteridine derivatives called russupteridines that are not found in the milk-caps. Sesquiterpenes are characteristic secondary metabolites of many Russulaceae, especially milk-caps which have been quite intensively studied. They are thought to be responsible for the hot taste in many species and may have deterrent, antifeeding functions in nature.

Other metabolites isolated from different species include dibenzonaphtyridinone alkaloids, prenylated phenols, benzofurans, chromenes, natural rubber (polyisoprene), sterols, and the sugar alcohol volemitol. Among toxic substances, Lactarius turpis contains the mutagenic alkaloid necatorin, and the small compound cycloprop-2-ene carboxylic acid has been identified as the toxic agent in Russula subnigricans. Some secondary metabolites showed antibiotic properties in laboratory tests. An ethanolic extract of Russula delica was antibacterial, and a lectin from Russula rosea showed antitumor activity.
