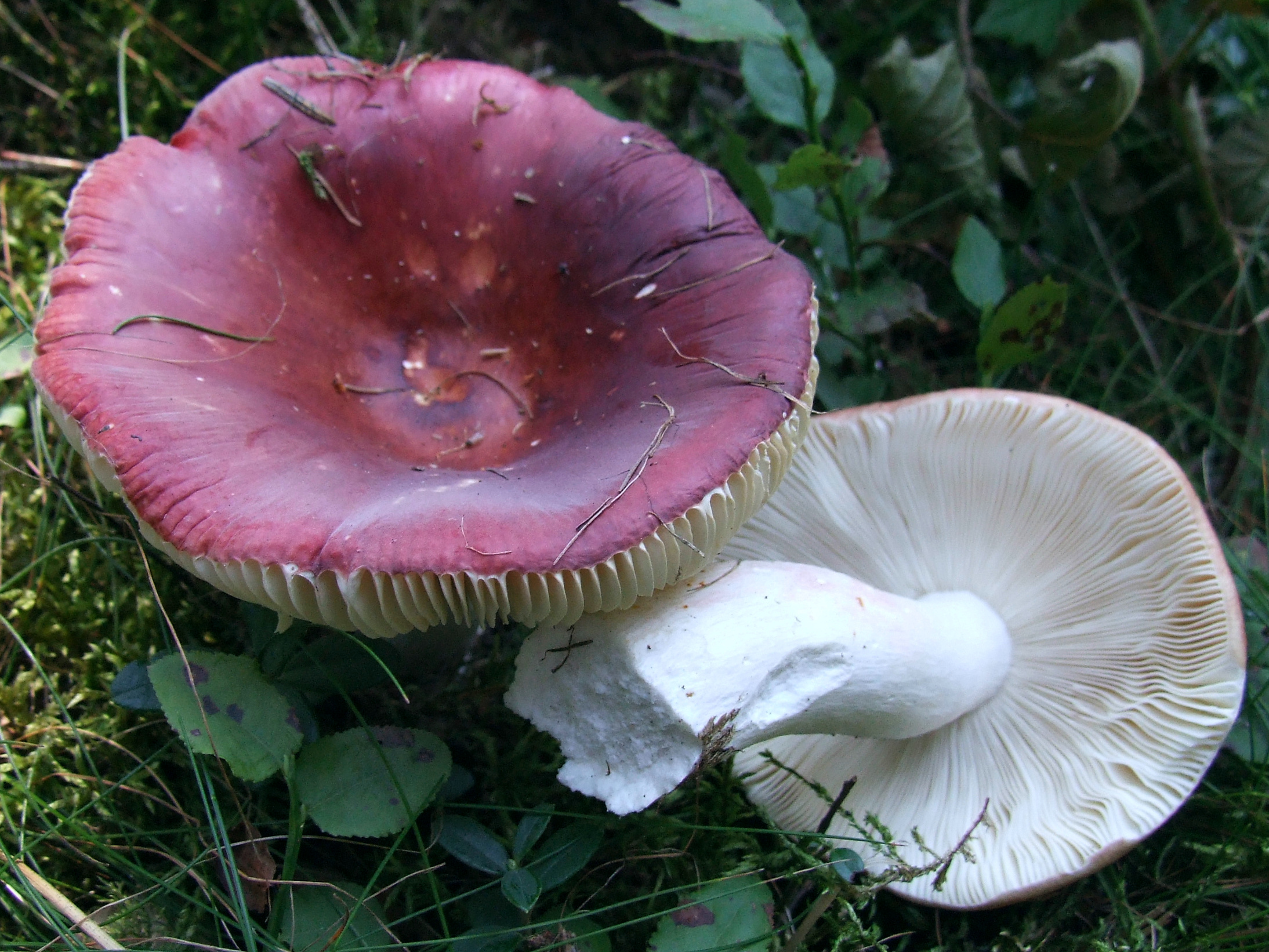

Scientific classification
- Kingdom: Fungi
- Division: Basidiomycota
- Class: Agaricomycetes
- Order: Russulales
- Family: Russulaceae
- Genus: Russula
- Species: R. vinosa

Binomial name
- Russula vinosa Lindblad (1901)

Synonyms
- Russula obscura (Romel, 1906)

= Russula vinosa =

Species of fungus

Russula vinosa
- Mycological characteristics
- Gills on hymenium
- Cap is convex or depressed
- Hymenium is free or adnexed
- Stipe is bare
- Spore print is yellow to cream
- Ecology is mycorrhizal
- Edibility is edible

Russula vinosa, commonly known as the graying olive brittlegill or darkening brittlegill, is a species of basidiomycete mushroom found in coniferous woodlands in Europe and North America in summer and early autumn. Unlike many red-capped members of the russula genus, it is edible and mild-tasting. It is usually understood to have a symbiotic relationship with evergreen tree roots, except for in mountainous areas where it has occasionally associated with birches.

== Taxonomy ==
Russula vinosa was originally described in the Swedish guide Svampbok, (lit. 'Mushroom Book'), written by M. A. Lindblad for publication in 1901. Romel who came up with the synonymous Russula obscura was an editor for the 1913 release of the text. The specific epithet "vinosa" is derived from the Latin vinum "wine", likely alluding to the wine-colored cap of this species that is capable of acting as a dye.

== Description ==
The cap is concave and wine to red-brown in colour, often fading to a pale white or tan in the center with age. The widely spaced gills are white, and adnexed or free. The stipe is cylindrical and white or cream colored. The brittle flesh is light and the taste is mild.

== Similar species ==
The red-capped color of Russula vinosa is almost impossible to visually separate from other toxic and inedible red-capped Russulas, such as the bloody brittlegill (R. sanguinaria), the sickener (R. emetica), and the beechwood sickener (R. nobilis). It may also be confused with similar edible species such as Russula paludosa and Russula decolorans. It is therefore important to identify the mushroom with absolute certainty before consumption. Chinese and Southeast Asian populations of R. vinosa have been determined to be genetically distinct enough from R. vinosa to be placed in a separate, but anatomically identical species, R. griseocarnosa.

== Distribution and habitat ==
Russula vinosa is found in Europe and North America. It is known from Great Britain, Southern Europe, New England, and Fennoscandia. It usually occurs in coniferous tree stands in summer and early autumn.

== Edibility ==
Unlike many other red-capped members of the genus, Russula vinosa is mild-tasting and edible. In Sweden where its edibility is noted, it is known as "Vinkremla" alluding to its wine color.

== See also ==
- List of Russula species
