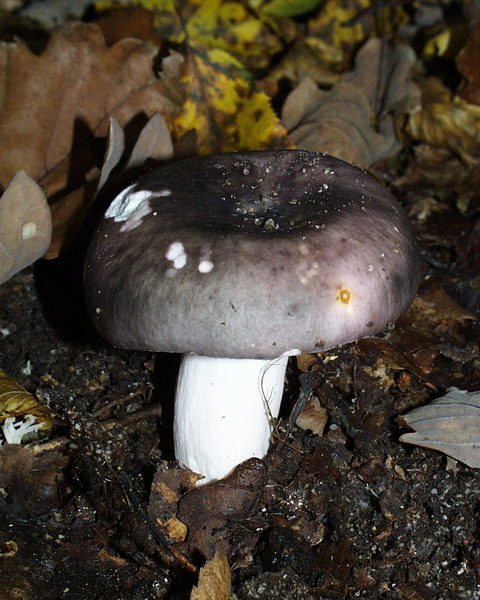
- Russula cyanoxantha

Conservation status
- Least Concern (IUCN 3.1)

Scientific classification
- Kingdom: Fungi
- Division: Basidiomycota
- Class: Agaricomycetes
- Order: Russulales
- Family: Russulaceae
- Genus: Russula
- Species: R. cyanoxantha

Binomial name
- Russula cyanoxantha (Schaeff.) Fr. (1863)

Synonyms
- List: Agaricus cyanoxanthus Schaeff. (1774); Agaricus pectinatus var. cyanoxanthus (Schaeff.) Duby (1830); Russula vesca var. cyanoxantha (Schaeff.) Fr. (1849); Russula variata Banning (1881); Russula cyanoxantha var. variata (Banning) Singer (1934); Russula cutefracta Cooke (1881); Russula cyanoxantha var. cutefracta (Cooke) Sarnari (1992); Russula cyanoxantha f. cutefracta (Cooke) Sarnari (1993); Russula lilacina Quél. ex Gillet (1884); Russula cyanoxantha f. pallida Singer (1923); Russula cyanoxantha f. peltereaui Singer (1925); Russula peltereaui (Singer) Moreau (1996); Russula cyanoxantha f. atroviolacea J.E. Lange (1938); Russula flavoviridis Romagn. (1962); Russula cyanoxantha var. flavoviridis (Romagn.) Sarnari (1992); Russula cyanoxantha var. subacerba Reumaux (1996)

= Russula cyanoxantha =

Species of fungus

Russula cyanoxantha
- Mycological characteristics
- Gills on hymenium
- Cap is flat or convex
- Hymenium is adnate
- Stipe is bare
- Spore print is white
- Ecology is mycorrhizal
- Edibility is choice

Russula cyanoxantha, commonly known as the charcoal burner or variegated russula, is a basidiomycete mushroom. It can be confused for a number of other members of its genus. Found mostly in Europe (with North American counterparts), it is an edible mushroom.

== Description ==
The most salient characteristic is the weak gills, which feel greasy to the touch, are flexible and do not break. The cap is 4–18 cm (1 1/2–7 in) wide, convex at first and later flattened, and greenish to bright brown; they vary considerably in color. The white-to-cream gills are sometimes forked and are not as brittle as most other members of the genus. The stipe is pure white, slightly convex underneath, from 2.5–12 cm (1–4 3/4 in) in height and 1–5 cm (1/2–2 in) in diameter.

The spores are white, as is the spore print. The stipe does not produce a salmon reaction when rubbed with ferrous sulphate.

=== Similar species ===
The cap of the grey-green Russula grisea is more blue-grey but has violet or green hues with light cream gills; it also grows in mixed forests, particularly under beech, and more rarely in coniferous forests. Russula olivacea also may have a variegated cap, but produces yellow spores. R. aeruginea is greenish and has forked gills. R. variata is frequently forked and found in the east. R. versicolor has yellowish, unforked gills.

== Habitat and distribution ==
Russula cyanoxantha grows in slightly acidic, but nutrient-rich soil. Like all Russulas, it is a mycorrhizal fungus. It is found most commonly in beech forests, and often in deciduous or mixed forests.

It is possible that only European specimens are actually R. cyanoxantha. It has been described as appearing from July to October in eastern North America and the Mountain states, and from October to January further west.

== Uses ==
This mushroom is edible, being suitable for many kinds of preparation; the flesh is not as hard as that of many other edible Russulas. It has a mild, nutty taste, but the mushroom is often infested with maggots.

== In culture ==
It was designated "Mushroom of the Year" in 1997 by the German Association of Mycology.

== See also ==
- List of Russula species
