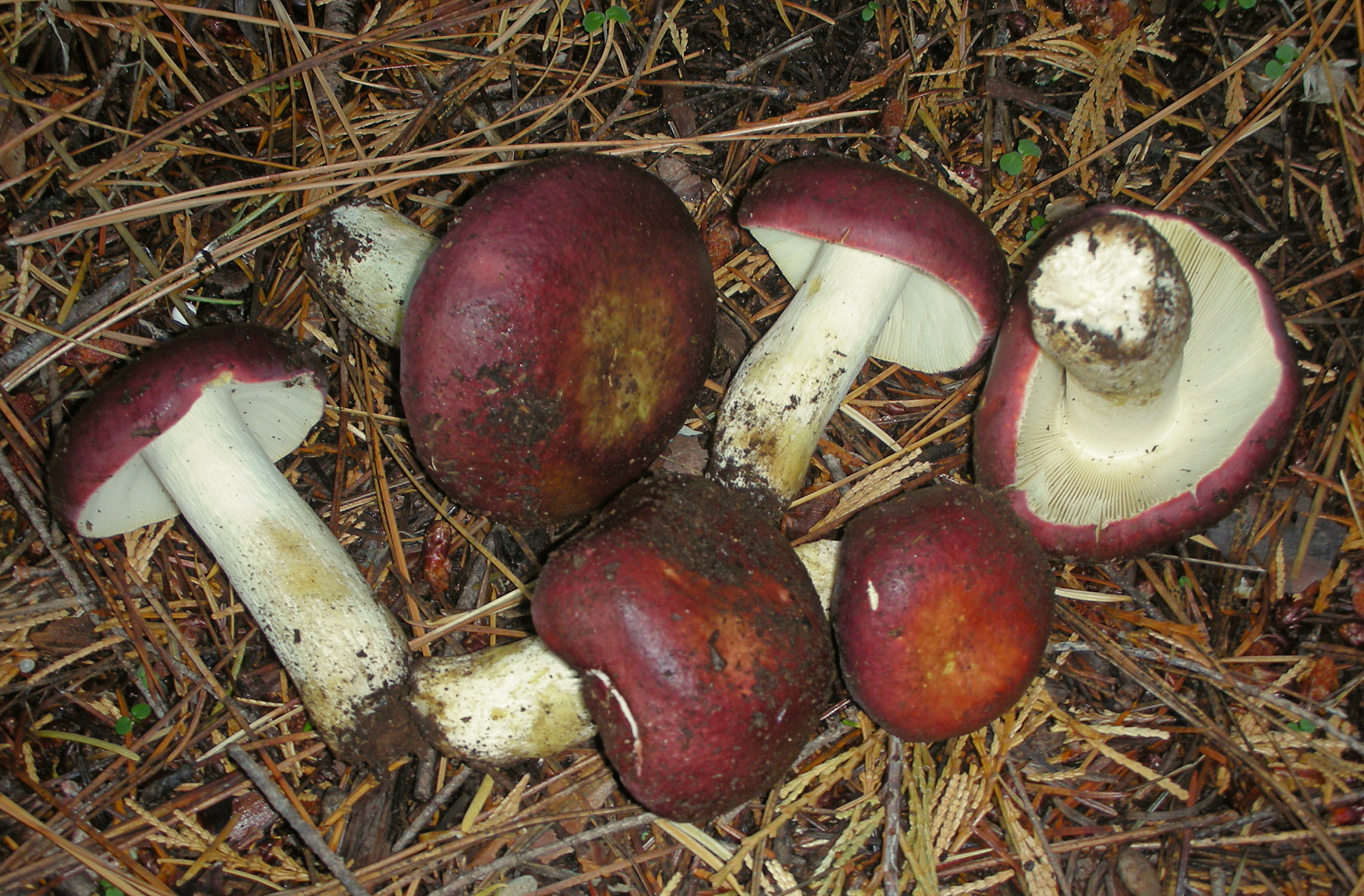

Scientific classification
- Kingdom: Fungi
- Division: Basidiomycota
- Class: Agaricomycetes
- Order: Russulales
- Family: Russulaceae
- Genus: Russula
- Species: R. xerampelina

Binomial name
- Russula xerampelina (Schaeff.) Fr.

Synonyms
- Russula erythropoda Russula erythropus Pelt.

= Russula xerampelina =

Russula xerampelina
- Mycological characteristics
- Gills on hymenium
- Cap is convex or flat
- Hymenium is free
- Stipe is bare
- Spore print is ochre
- Ecology is mycorrhizal
- Edibility is choice

Russula xerampelina, also commonly known as the shrimp russula, crab brittlegill, or shrimp mushroom, is a basidiomycete mushroom of the brittlegill genus Russula. Two subspecies are recognised. The fruiting bodies appear in coniferous woodlands in autumn in northern Europe and North America. Their caps are coloured various shades of wine-red, purple to green. Mild tasting and edible, it is one of the most highly regarded brittlegills for the table. It is also notable for smelling of shellfish or crab when fresh.

== Taxonomy ==
Russula xerampelina was originally described in 1770 as Agaricus xerampelina from a collection in Bavaria by the German mycologist Jacob Christian Schaeffer, who noted the colour as fusco-purpureus or "purple-brown". It was later given its present binomial name by Swedish mycologist Elias Magnus Fries. Its specific epithet is taken from the Ancient Greek meaning "colour of dried vine leaves", xeros meaning "dry", and ampělinos or "of the vine".

Two subspecies have been recognised, var. xerampelina and var. tenuicarnosa, with thinner flesh in the cap and the stipe. The name R. erythropoda is now considered a synonym, and former subspecies R. (xerampelina subsp.) amoenipes (originally named by Henri Romagnesi) now a separate species. A former variety with a greenish cap, R. xerampelina var. elaeodes, is now classified as R. clavipes.

Recent studies show that Russula xerampelina is actually a species complex, with at least three species: R. xerampelina, R. clavipes, and R. graviolens. Sometimes, more than three are recognized, including R. olympiana.

As the first defined species, it gives its name to the section Xerampelinae, a group of related species within the genus Russula, occasionally all termed R. xerampelina in the past.

Common names include shrimp mushroom, shrimp Russula, crab brittlegill, and shellfish-scented Russula.

== Description ==
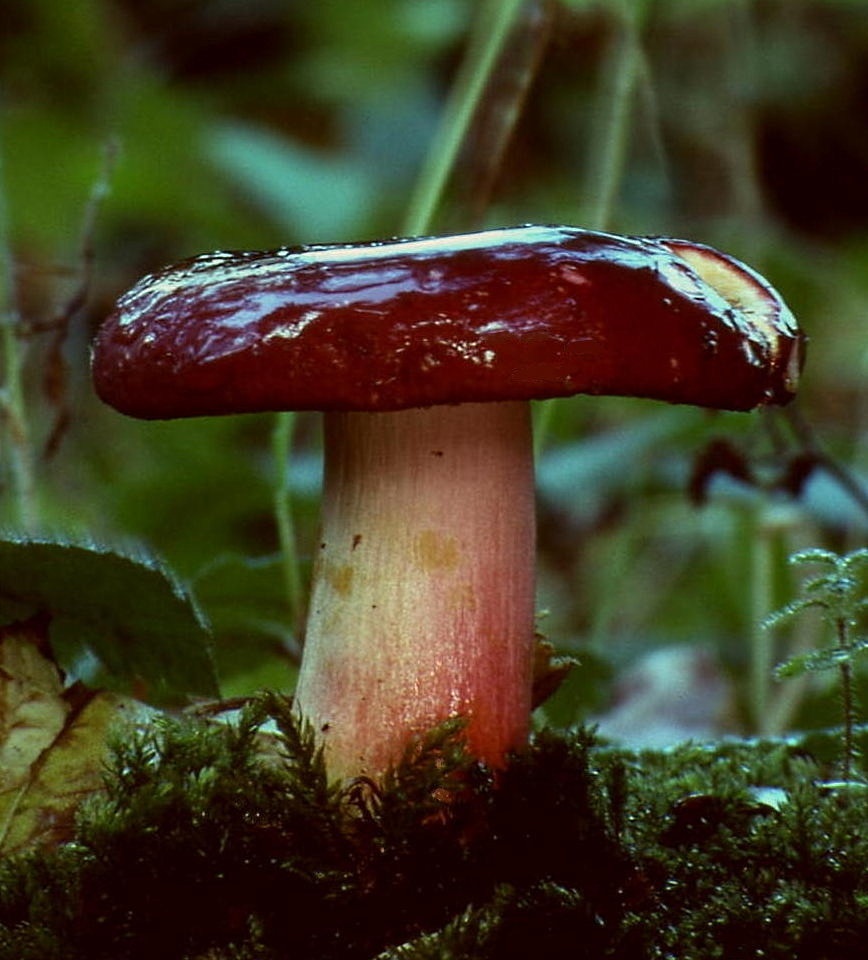
A colour variation

Russula xerampelina has a characteristic odour of boiled crab or shrimp. Trimethylamine and its precursor, trimethylamine N-oxide, are the source of this mushroom's distinct odour. The cap is 5–20 cm (2–8 in) wide, domed, flat, or with a slightly depressed centre, and sticky. The colour is variable, most commonly purple to wine-red, or greenish, and darker towards the centre of the cap. There are fine grooves up to 1 cm long running perpendicular to the margin.

The stipe is 4–12 cm (1.5–4.5 in) long, 1.5–4 cm (0.5–1.5 in) wide, cylindrical, white or sometimes with a reddish blush, bruising brown. The gills have a mild to rather bitter taste, narrowly spaced, and turn creamy-yellow on aging specimens. The spore print is creamy-yellow to ochre. The oval spores measure 8.8–9.9 by 6.7–7.8 μm and are covered with 1 μm spines.

This Russula has been divided into several similar species by some mycologists. However, they all have the singular dark green colour reaction to iron salts (iron(II) sulfate) when applied to the flesh and smell of shellfish. This aroma is quite distinct and becomes stronger with age.

=== Similar species ===
More reddish-capped forms could be confused with the sickener (R. emetica), although the latter always has a white stipe and gills; greener-capped species may resemble R. aeruginea.

Many other species in the genus are similar, e.g. R. graveolens, but most lack the seafood smell. Russula olivacea has a more velvety cap.

== Distribution and ecology ==
Russula xerampelina is widely distributed; quite common in northern temperate zones, and often ranging into the Arctic Circle, it also ranges south to Costa Rica. In North America, it appears from July to October to the east and October to January in the west. Variety tenuicarnosa has been found on sandy soils under pine in Slovakia and northern Italy in Trentino.

It grows solitary, or in groups with conifers, and seems to have a preference for Douglas fir, or more rarely pine trees or larch. It is sometimes found in deciduous woods, such as beech and oak.

Adults of the pleasing fungus beetle Tritoma angulata have been recorded from this fungus, but it does not seem to be a regular food source for them.

== Uses ==
The flavor is mild. This russula is considered one of the best edible species of its genus, although the shellfish smell will persist even when cooking. This is less pleasant in older specimens. The young caps are said to be superb stuffed with any suitable ingredients, and are rarely maggoty.

== See also ==
- List of Russula species
