= R. graveolens =

R. graveolens may refer to:

- Russula graveolens, an edible fungus species
- Ruta graveolens, the common rue or herb of grace, a flowering plant species native to the Balkan Peninsula
