= Russula albidoflava =

Scientific classification
- Kingdom: Fungi
- Division: Basidiomycota
- Class: Agaricomycetes
- Order: Russulales
- Family: Russulaceae
- Genus: Russula
- Species: R. albidoflava

Binomial name
- Russula albidoflava T.Lebel

Species of fungus

Russula albidoflava is a fungus in the family, Russulaceae, found "in stands of Eucalyptus globulus" in Tasmania.

It was first described in 2007 by Teresa Lebel and Jennifer Tonkin.
