= Russula sinuata =

Scientific classification
- Domain: Eukaryota
- Kingdom: Fungi
- Division: Basidiomycota
- Class: Agaricomycetes
- Order: Russulales
- Family: Russulaceae
- Genus: Russula
- Species: R. sinuata

Binomial name
- Russula sinuata T.Lebel

Species of fungus

Russula sinuata is a fungus in the family, Russulaceae, found in eucalyptus forests in Tasmania (E. angophoroides, E. gummifera and E. maculata).

It was first described in 2007 by Teresa Lebel and Jennifer Tonkin.
