= Russula albobrunnea =

Scientific classification
- Domain: Eukaryota
- Kingdom: Fungi
- Division: Basidiomycota
- Class: Agaricomycetes
- Order: Russulales
- Family: Russulaceae
- Genus: Russula
- Species: R. albobrunnea

Binomial name
- Russula albobrunnea T.Lebel

Species of fungus

Russula albobrunnea is a fungus in the family, Russulaceae, found Nothofagus forests (N. cunninghamii, N. moorei) of Queensland.

It was first described in 2007 by Teresa Lebel and Jennifer Tonkin.
