= Russula variispora =

Scientific classification
- Domain: Eukaryota
- Kingdom: Fungi
- Division: Basidiomycota
- Class: Agaricomycetes
- Order: Russulales
- Family: Russulaceae
- Genus: Russula
- Species: R. variispora

Binomial name
- Russula variispora T.Lebel

Species of fungus

Russula variispora is a fungus in the family, Russulaceae, found in eucalypt forests in New South Wales.

It was first described in 2007 by Teresa Lebel and Jennifer Tonkin.
