= Russula agaricina =

Scientific classification
- Kingdom: Fungi
- Division: Basidiomycota
- Class: Agaricomycetes
- Order: Russulales
- Family: Russulaceae
- Genus: Russula
- Species: R. agaricina

Binomial name
- Russula agaricina (Kalchbr. ex Berk.) Trappe & T.F.Elliott (2018)

Synonyms
- Macowania agaricina Kalchbr. ex Berk. (1876); Macowanites agaricinus (Kalchbr. ex Berk.) Kalchbr., Grevillea 10 (55): 107 (1882); Macowanites agaricinus Kalchbr. (1876); Russula agaricina (Kalchbr. ex Berk.) T.Lebel (2007)

Species of fungus

Russula agaricina is a fungus in the family, Russulaceae.

It was first described in 1876 as Macowania agaricina by Károly Kalchbrenner, and in 2007, based on phylogenetic evidence was transferred to the genus, Russula, by Teresa Lebel and Jennifer Tonkin (but invalidly published). The name, Russula agaricina was validly published in 2018 by James Trappe and Todd Elliott.
