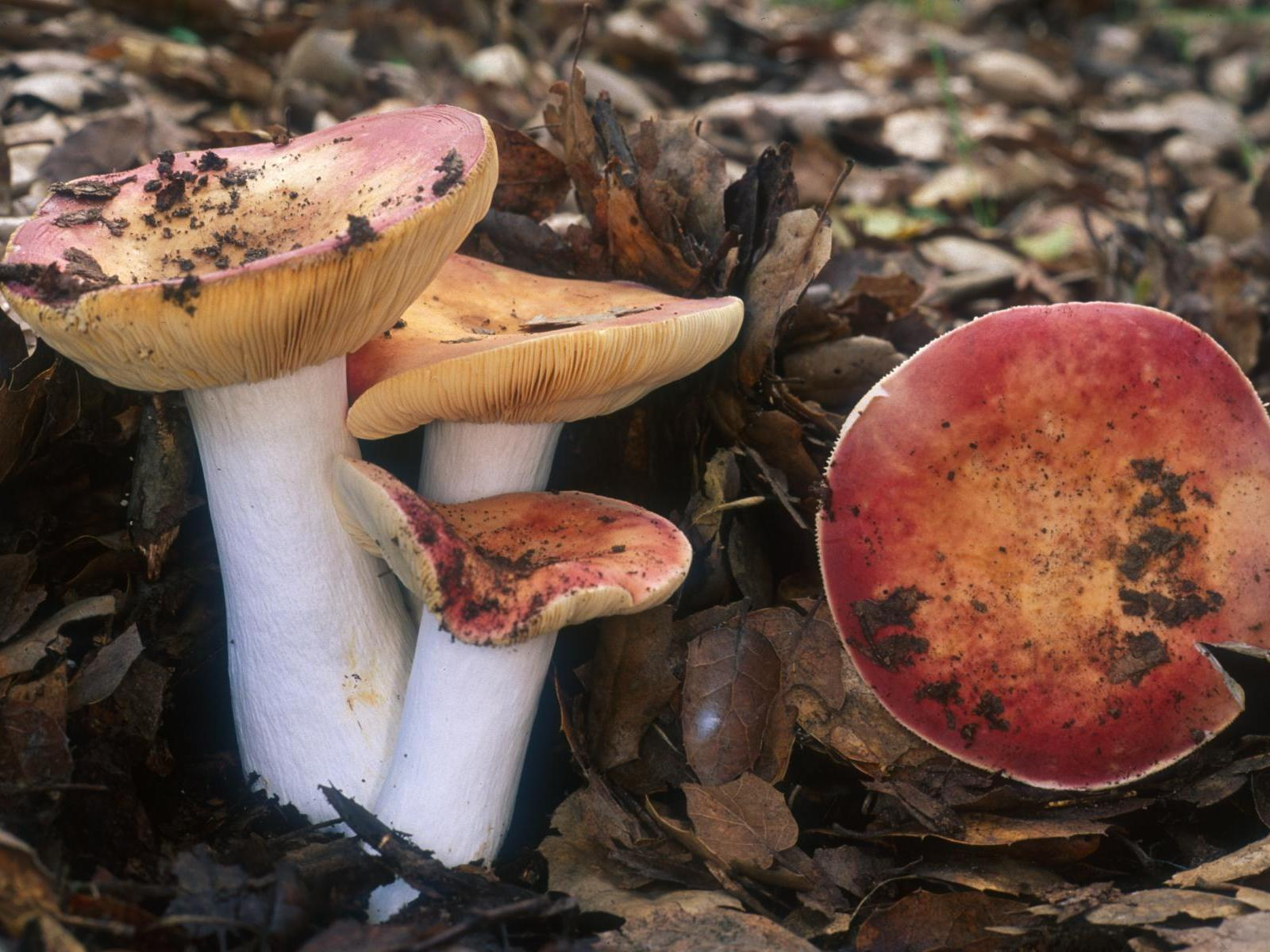

Scientific classification
- Kingdom: Fungi
- Division: Basidiomycota
- Class: Agaricomycetes
- Order: Russulales
- Family: Russulaceae
- Genus: Russula
- Species: R. maculata

Binomial name
- Russula maculata Quél. 1878

= Russula maculata =

Species of fungus

Russula maculata is a species of mushroom in the genus Russula. Its cap ranges from 4–10 centimetres (1 1/2–4 in) wide, with hues varying from whitish to red. It is difficult to distinguish reliably and its edibility is unknown.
