= Russula reddellii =

Scientific classification
- Kingdom: Fungi
- Division: Basidiomycota
- Class: Agaricomycetes
- Order: Russulales
- Family: Russulaceae
- Genus: Russula
- Species: R. reddellii

Binomial name
- Russula reddellii T.Lebel

Species of fungus

Russula reddellii is a fungus in the family, Russulaceae, found in leaf litter in "open, dry forests of Acacia, Allocasuarina, Eucalyptus, Lophostemon and Syncarpia" in Queensland.

It was first described in 2007 by Teresa Lebel and Jennifer Tonkin.
