= Russula galbana =

Conservation status
- Least Concern (IUCN 3.1)

Scientific classification
- Kingdom: Fungi
- Division: Basidiomycota
- Class: Agaricomycetes
- Order: Russulales
- Family: Russulaceae
- Genus: Russula
- Species: R. galbana

Binomial name
- Russula galbana T.Lebel

Species of fungus

Russula galbana is a fungus in the family, Russulaceae, found in leaf litter in open forests of Allocasuarina littoralis and Eucalyptus tereticornis in Queensland.

It was first described in 2007 by Teresa Lebel and Jennifer Tonkin.
