= Russula herrerae =

Scientific classification
- Domain: Eukaryota
- Kingdom: Fungi
- Division: Basidiomycota
- Class: Agaricomycetes
- Order: Russulales
- Family: Russulaceae
- Genus: Russula
- Species: R. herrerae

Binomial name
- Russula herrerae A.Kong, A.Montoya & Estrada (2002)

Species of fungus

Russula herrerae is an edible mushroom in the genus Russula. Described as new to science in 2002, it is found only in its type locality in Mexico, where it grows in temperate oak forests near the village of San Francisco Temezontla in the state of Tlaxcala. The specific epithet herrerae honors Mexican mycologist Teófilo Herrera. R. herrerae is classified in the section Plorantes, subsection Lactarioideae.

== Description ==
The fruit bodies have a white cap that is 5–10 cm (2.0–3.9 in) in diameter. The cap margin is appendiculate, meaning that there are patches of the partial veil attached to it. The brittle white gills have an adnate to decurrent attachment to the stem and are distantly spaced, with many lamellulae (short gills) interspersed between them. The white to yellowish stem measures 1–4.5 cm (0.4–1.8 in) long by 1–2.5 cm (0.4–1.0 in) thick and is equal in width throughout, or tapers towards the base. The color of the spore print ranges from white to pale cream.

The mushrooms are considered edible by most inhabitants of San Francisco Temezontla, who call it hongo blanco (white mushroom) or hongo blanco de ocote (pine white mushroom).

== See also ==
- List of Russula species
