= Russula cupreola =

Scientific classification
- Domain: Eukaryota
- Kingdom: Fungi
- Division: Basidiomycota
- Class: Agaricomycetes
- Order: Russulales
- Family: Russulaceae
- Genus: Russula
- Species: R. cupreola

Binomial name
- Russula cupreola Sarnari

Species of fungus

Russula cupreola is an agaricoid fungal species first typed in 1990. It shows a white stem and a purple/ochre coloured cap, with a maximum diameter of 30 mm. The gills will be white in younger fruiting bodies, but as the gills age they will become ochraceous. This species is currently found in Scandinavia.

== Merging of species ==
Russula cupreola and R. purpureofusca were merged under one name, Russula cupreola, in 2016. The typing of R. purpureofusca was done with a juvenile specimen of R. cupreola, leading mycologists to believe it was a separate species. After noticing similar features between the two species, researchers performed ITS1 sequencing and verified that the two species were conspecific.
