= Russula brunneonigra =

Scientific classification
- Kingdom: Fungi
- Division: Basidiomycota
- Class: Agaricomycetes
- Order: Russulales
- Family: Russulaceae
- Genus: Russula
- Species: R. brunneonigra

Binomial name
- Russula brunneonigra T.Lebel

Species of fungus

Russula brunneonigra is a fungus in the family Russulaceae, found in Eucalyptus forests in New South Wales.

It was first described in 2007 by Teresa Lebel and Jennifer Tonkin.
