= Russula pumicoidea =

Scientific classification
- Domain: Eukaryota
- Kingdom: Fungi
- Division: Basidiomycota
- Class: Agaricomycetes
- Order: Russulales
- Family: Russulaceae
- Genus: Russula
- Species: R. pumicoidea

Binomial name
- Russula pumicoidea T.Lebel

Species of fungus

Russula pumicoidea is a fungus in the family, Russulaceae, found on sandy soils in Eucalyptus forests in Western Australia.

It was first described in 2007 by Teresa Lebel and Jennifer Tonkin.
