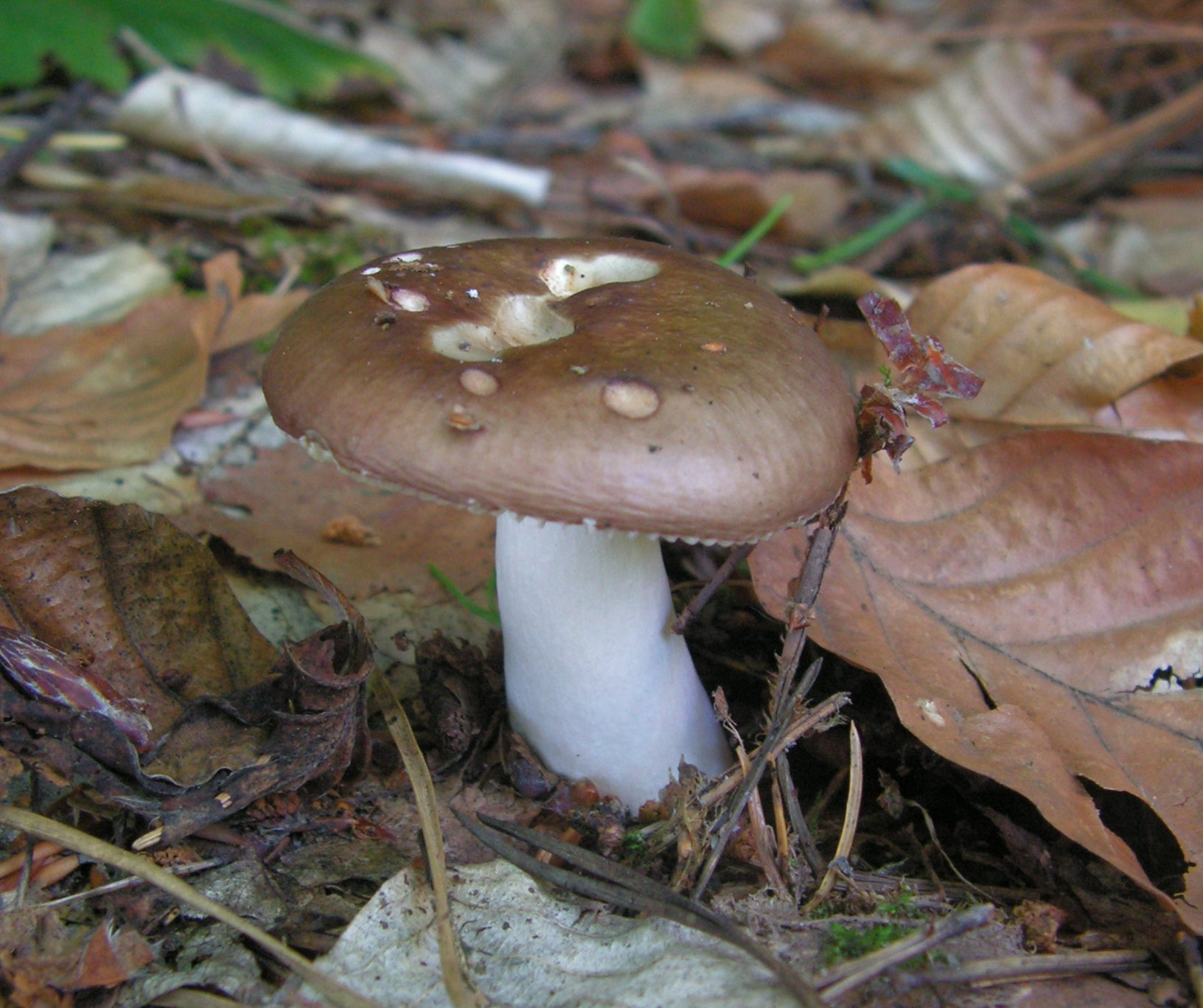

Scientific classification
- Kingdom: Fungi
- Division: Basidiomycota
- Class: Agaricomycetes
- Order: Russulales
- Family: Russulaceae
- Genus: Russula
- Species: R. integra

Binomial name
- Russula integra (L.) Fr.

Synonyms
- List: Agaricus alutaceus var. substypticus Pers. (1801); Agaricus integer L. (1753); Amanita rubra var. integer (L.) Lam. (1783); Amanita integra (L.) Roussel (1796); Russula adulterina (Fr.) Peck (1888); Russula alutacea f. grisella Singer (1932); Russula alutacea subsp. integra (L.) Singer (1932); Russula alutacea f. pseudo-olivascens Singer (1932); Russula alutacea f. purpurella Singer (1932); Russula fusca var. oreas (Romagn.) Bidaud (1996); Russula fusca f. pseudo-olivascens (Singer) Bidaud (1996); Russula fusca f. purpurella (Singer) Bidaud (1996); Russula gilva var. lutea (P. Karst.) J.E. Lange (1940); Russula polychroma sensu NCL (1960) Rayner (1985); Russula phlyctidospora (Romagn.) Bon (1986); Russula rubrotincta (Peck) Burl. (1915); Russula substiptica (Pers.) Mussat (1901); Russula trimbachii f. gigas (Romagn.) P.-A. Moreau, Carteret & Francini (1999); Russulina integra (L.) J. Schröt. (1889)

= Russula integra =

Species of fungus

Russula integra
- Mycological characteristics
- Gills on hymenium
- Cap is convex or depressed
- Hymenium is adnate or free
- Stipe is bare
- Spore print is yellow to ochre
- Ecology is mycorrhizal
- Edibility is edible but not recommended

Russula integra, commonly known as the entire russula, is a species of mushroom. The fungus stems from the huge genus of Russula. It is found in conifer forests across Europe and throughout North America.

The fruiting body is mildly flavoured with a slight cashew-like taste and dense flesh. It is edible when cooked thoroughly and is popular in parts of Europe.

== Description ==
The cap is almost shaped like a sphere at first, and soon becomes flattened or depressed; it is 6–12 cm (2.4–4.7 in) broad. The cuticle is shiny, varies in color, but is usually brown and tinged with violet, purple, yellow, or green. The gills are thick, widely spaced, easily crumbled into small pieces, white at first and then turns bright yellow eventually. The stipe is thick and white, but stains yellow or russet with age; it measures 5–12 cm (2.0–4.7 in) long and 2–3 cm (0.79–1.18 in) thick. The flesh is white, very firm, and has a mild flavor. The spore print is yellow-ochre, broadly elliptical, and has amyloid warts.

=== Similar species ===
Russula mustelina is similar, with a brown cap, white stalk, yellow spores, and firm flesh.

== Habitat and distribution ==
The species is widely distributed and can commonly be found scattered under conifers. It can commonly be found in spruce forests or fir forests in the mountains. The species is rare in New York and can be found there in August.

== Edibility ==
The species has a crunchy texture and tastes nutty. It is popular to eat in Northern and Central Europe. In Romanian, the mushroom is called pâinişoară ("little bread") due to its edibility and perceived taste and texture. According to David Arora, the species is good when it is young. There are similar-looking species with unknown edibility.

According to an 1878 study, poisoning from this species used to be frequent, but is now rare. The study concluded that long cooking gets rid of its toxic properties, but that rapid culinary processes such as roasting do not.
