= Russula alachuana =

Scientific classification
- Domain: Eukaryota
- Kingdom: Fungi
- Division: Basidiomycota
- Class: Agaricomycetes
- Order: Russulales
- Family: Russulaceae
- Genus: Russula
- Species: R. alachuana

Binomial name
- Russula alachuana Murrill

Species of fungus

Russula alachuana is a species of mushroom.

== See also ==
- List of Russula species
