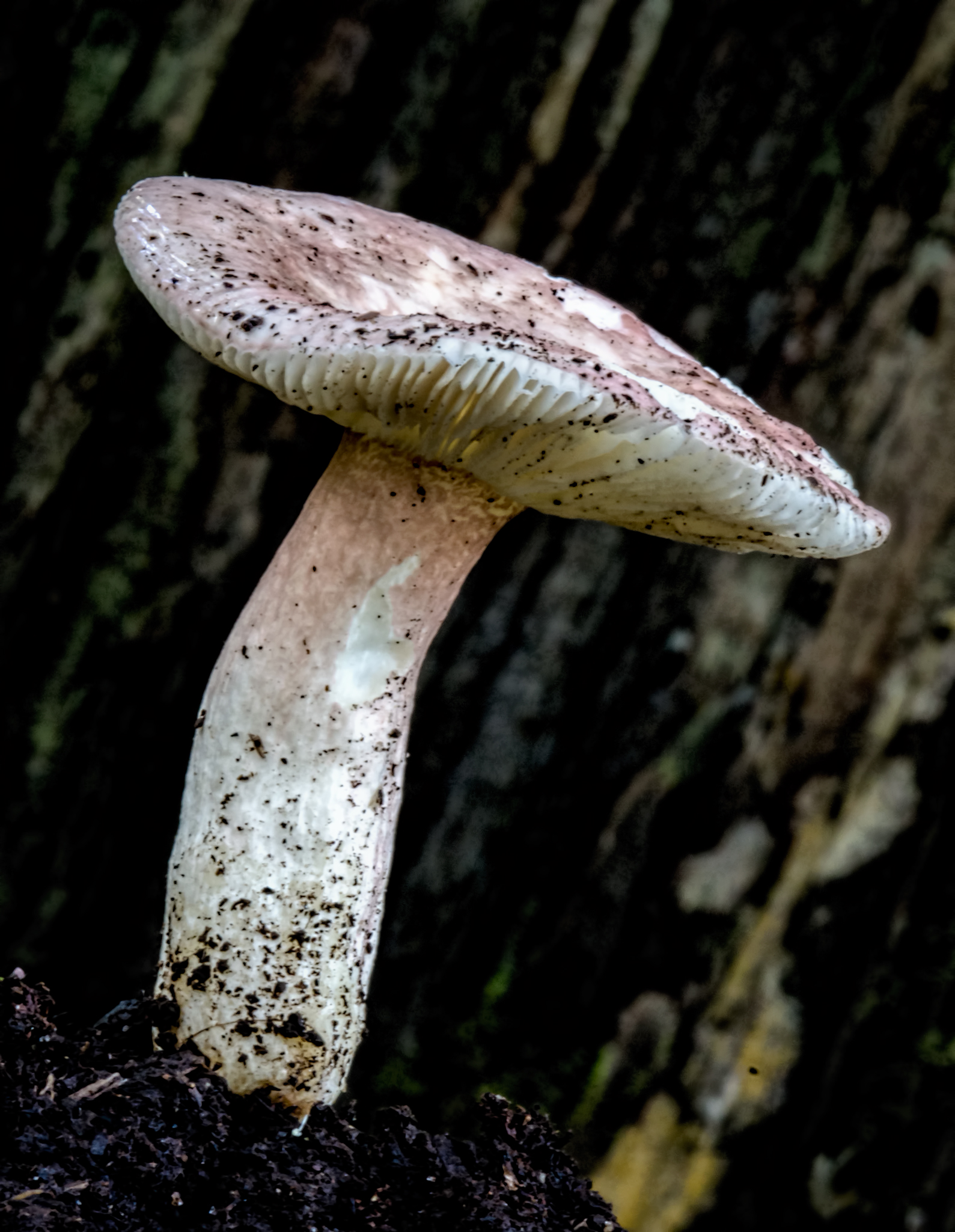

Scientific classification
- Domain: Eukaryota
- Kingdom: Fungi
- Division: Basidiomycota
- Class: Agaricomycetes
- Order: Russulales
- Family: Russulaceae
- Genus: Russula
- Species: R. lenkunya

Binomial name
- Russula lenkunya Grgur. (1997)

= Russula lenkunya =

Species of fungus

Russula lenkunya is a mushroom in the genus Russula. Found in South Australia, it was first described scientifically by mycologist Cheryl Grgurinovic in 1997.

== See also ==
- List of Russula species
