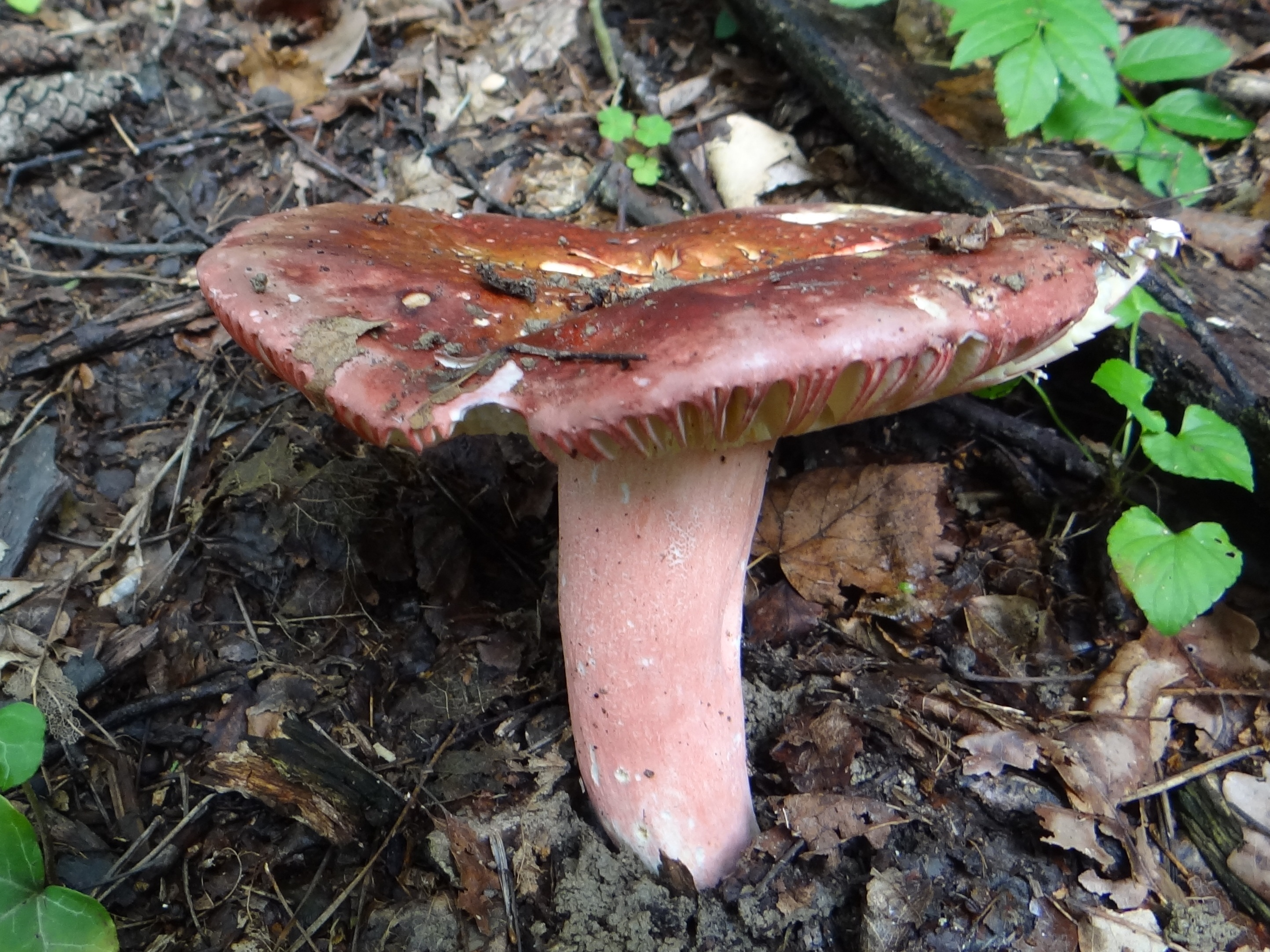

Scientific classification
- Kingdom: Fungi
- Division: Basidiomycota
- Class: Agaricomycetes
- Order: Russulales
- Family: Russulaceae
- Genus: Russula
- Species: R. badia

Binomial name
- Russula badia Quélet (1881)

= Russula badia =

Species of fungus

Russula badia, also known as the burning brittlegill, is a species of mushroom in the genus Russula.
