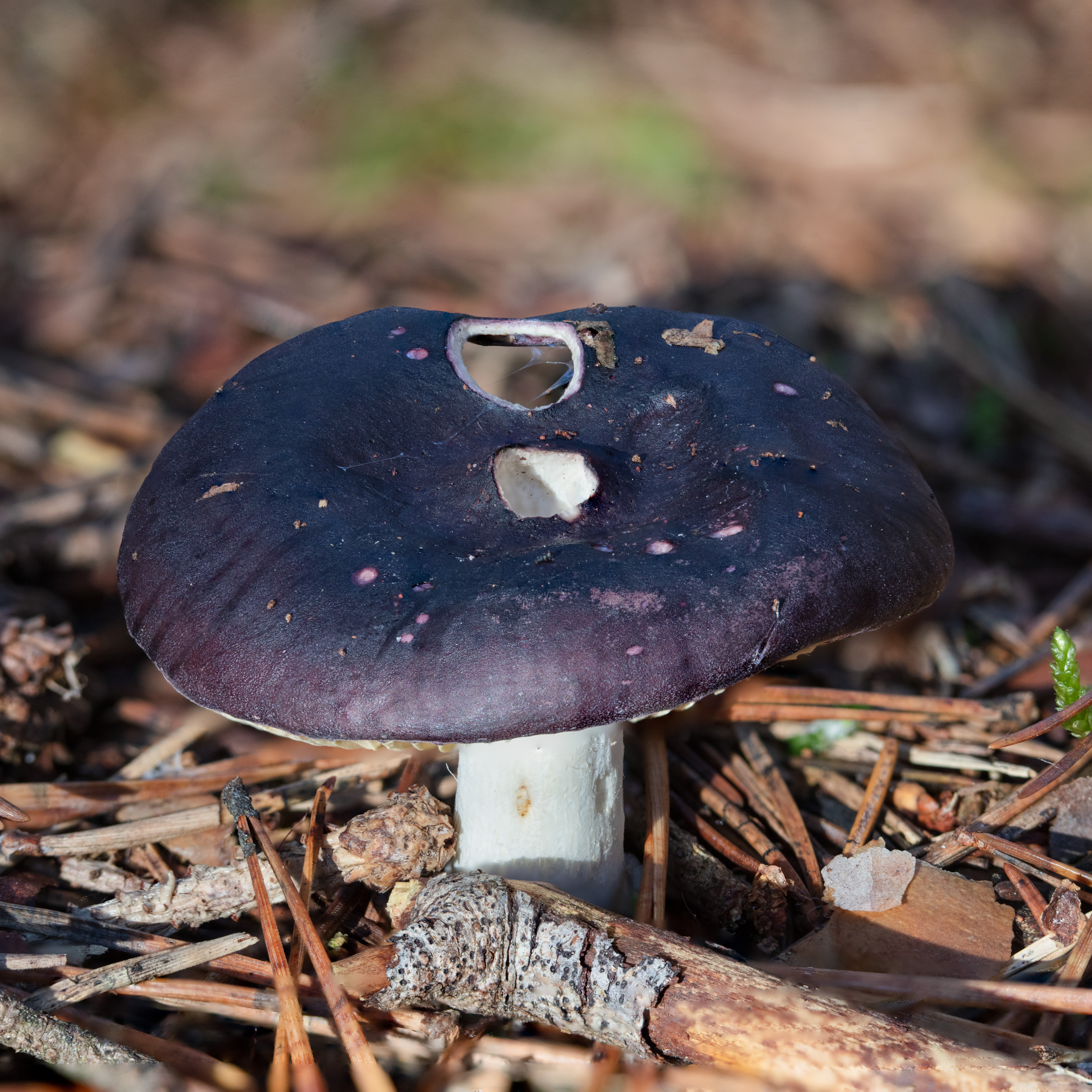
- Exemplar in Bavaria, Germany

Scientific classification
- Kingdom: Fungi
- Division: Basidiomycota
- Class: Agaricomycetes
- Order: Russulales
- Family: Russulaceae
- Genus: Russula
- Species: R. firmula

Binomial name
- Russula firmula Jul. Schäff.
- Distribution of Russula firmula in Europe and Asia

= Russula firmula =

Species of fungus

Russula firmula
- Mycological characteristics
- Gills on hymenium
- Stipe is bare
- Spore print is yellow
- Ecology is mycorrhizal
- Edibility is unknown

Russula firmula is a species of mushroom found in Europe and parts of Asia that has dark red-purple to red-brown cap. It is one of about 750 species in the genus Russula, which is distributed worldwide. Together with R. rubra, R. rutila and R. veternos, it was placed in the Rubrinae clade in 2017.

== Description ==
Russula firmula has a yellow spore print. Its spores measure about 8.4 by 7 μm and have .8-1.2 μm high spines. Its pileocystidia measure around 72.5 by 10.3 μm. There are incrustations on its pileocystidia which stain bright pink after about 30 minutes in sulphovanillin, in contrast with the rest of the pileocystidia which stain black. The terminal cells at the cap margins are cylindrical, though tapered narrowly at one end. The basidia are around 46 by 12.8 μm.

== Ecology ==
It is ectomycorrhizal with conifers, particularly spruce trees. It has a bitter taste.
