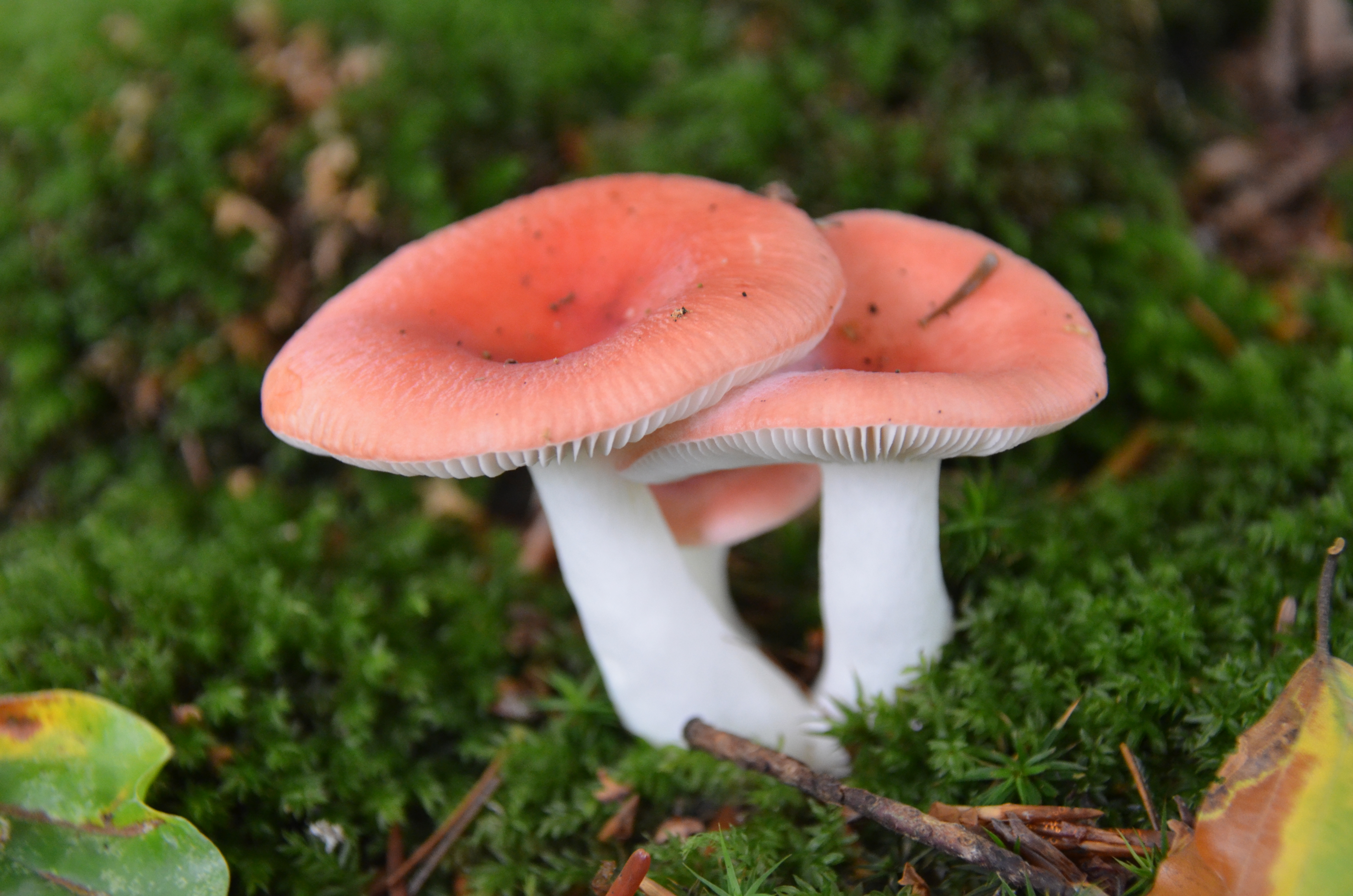

Scientific classification
- Kingdom: Fungi
- Division: Basidiomycota
- Class: Agaricomycetes
- Order: Russulales
- Family: Russulaceae
- Genus: Russula
- Species: R. paludosa

Binomial name
- Russula paludosa Britzelm. (1891)

Synonyms
- R. elatior Lindbl. (1901); R. fragaria Kudrna (1919); R. integra var. paludosa (Britzelm.) Singer (1923); R. integra var. rubrotincta Peck (1902); R. olgae Velen. (1920)

= Russula paludosa =

Russula paludosa
- Mycological characteristics
- Gills on hymenium
- Cap is convex
- Hymenium is decurrent
- Stipe is bare
- Spore print is ochre
- Ecology is mycorrhizal
- Edibility is edible

Russula paludosa is an edible species of mushroom within the large genus Russula. It is common to Europe and North America.

== Description ==
The cap is convex to depressed and is coloured a distinctive bloody red, pink, crimson or purple. Sometimes it may show a yellowish or orange tinge in the centre. It may measure between 6 and 20 cm in diameter. The flesh is white with a mild taste and without scent; it quickly becomes soft and spongy and also greyish. The crowded gills are cream coloured when young, and become yellow with age. They are adnexed and are generally thin. Their edges may sometimes occur reddish. The amyloid, elli spores measure 8–10 by 7–10 μm are warty and are covered by an incomplete mesh. The stem is white, sometimes with a pink hue, slightly clubbed. It may measure 5 to 15 cm in height and up to 3 cm in diameter.

== Distribution and ecology ==
R. paludosa is mycorrhizal and occurs in coniferous woodlands and in peat bogs of Europe and North America; preferably under pine trees, where it forms mycorrhizae. Locally it can be very common.

Adults of the pleasing fungus beetle Tritoma angulata have been recorded from this fungus, but it does not seem to be a regular food source for them.

== Edibility ==
The mushroom is edible and is a common good in Finnish markets. Yet it may easily be mistaken for Russula emetica, which is poisonous.

== See also ==
- List of Russula species
