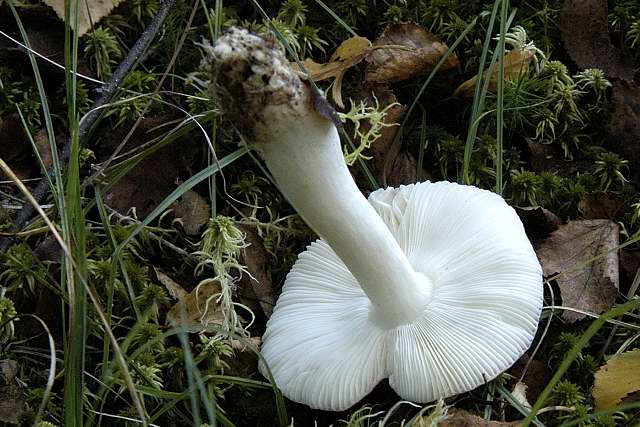

Scientific classification
- Kingdom: Fungi
- Division: Basidiomycota
- Class: Agaricomycetes
- Order: Russulales
- Family: Russulaceae
- Genus: Russula
- Species: R. versicolor

Binomial name
- Russula versicolor Jul.Schäff. (1931)

= Russula versicolor =

Species of fungus

Russula versicolor, commonly known as the birch brittlegill, is a mushroom in the genus Russula. It is considered inedible.

== Description ==
The cap of Russula versicolor is variable in color, ranging from purplish to greenish to whitish. It can sometimes be a mix of different colors. It is convex to depressed and is about 2–6 centimetres (0.79–2.36 in) in diameter. The gills are adnate to free, and cream-colored. The stipe is white to yellowish, and about 2–5 centimetres (0.79–1.97 in) long and 0.5–1.5 centimetres (0.20–0.59 in) wide. The spore print is creamy to yellowish in color, and the taste is acrid.

== Distribution and habitat ==
Russula versicolor is often found under planted birch trees in parks. It fruits during late summer and fall. It is known to occur in Europe and the Pacific Northwest. However, genetic studies show that the Pacific Northwestern version may be a distinct species.

== See also ==
- List of Russula species
