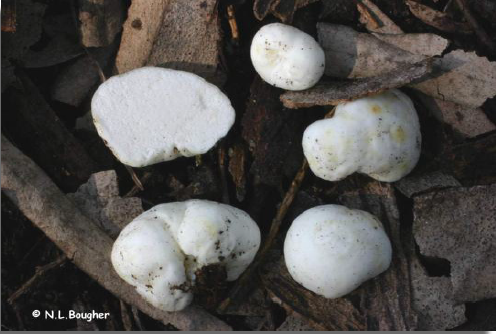
- Cystangium balpineum - White Sessile Truffle

Scientific classification
- Domain: Eukaryota
- Kingdom: Fungi
- Division: Basidiomycota
- Class: Agaricomycetes
- Order: Russulales
- Family: Russulaceae
- Genus: Cystangium; Singer & A.H.Sm. (1960)

Type species
- Cystangium sessile (Massee & Rodway ex Rodway) Singer & A.H.Sm. (1960)

= Cystangium =

Genus of fungi

Cystangium is a genus of fungi in the family Russulaceae. The genus contains 32 species that are distributed in Australia and South America. Cystangium was described by American mycologists Rolf Singer and Alexander H. Smith in 1960.

The taxon is phylogenetically part of Russula and thus probably a synonym. However, it has not been formally synonymised yet and continues to be used by taxonomists.

== Species ==
- Cystangium balpineum
- Cystangium bisporum
- Cystangium capitis-orae
- Cystangium clavatum
- Cystangium depauperatum
- Cystangium domingueziae
- Cystangium echinosporum
- Cystangium flavovirens
- Cystangium gamundiae
- Cystangium grandihyphatum
- Cystangium idahoensis
- Cystangium longisterigmatum
- Cystangium luteobrunneum
- Cystangium lymanensis
- Cystangium macrocystidium
- Cystangium maculatum
- Cystangium medlockii
- Cystangium megasporum
- Cystangium nothofagi
- Cystangium oregonense
- Cystangium phymatodisporum
- Cystangium pineti
- Cystangium pisiglarea
- Cystangium polychromum
- Cystangium rodwayi
- Cystangium seminudum
- Cystangium sessile
- Cystangium shultziae
- Cystangium sparsum
- Cystangium thaxteri
- Cystangium theodoroui
- Cystangium trappei
- Cystangium variabilisporum
- Cystangium vesiculosum
- Cystangium xanthocarpum
