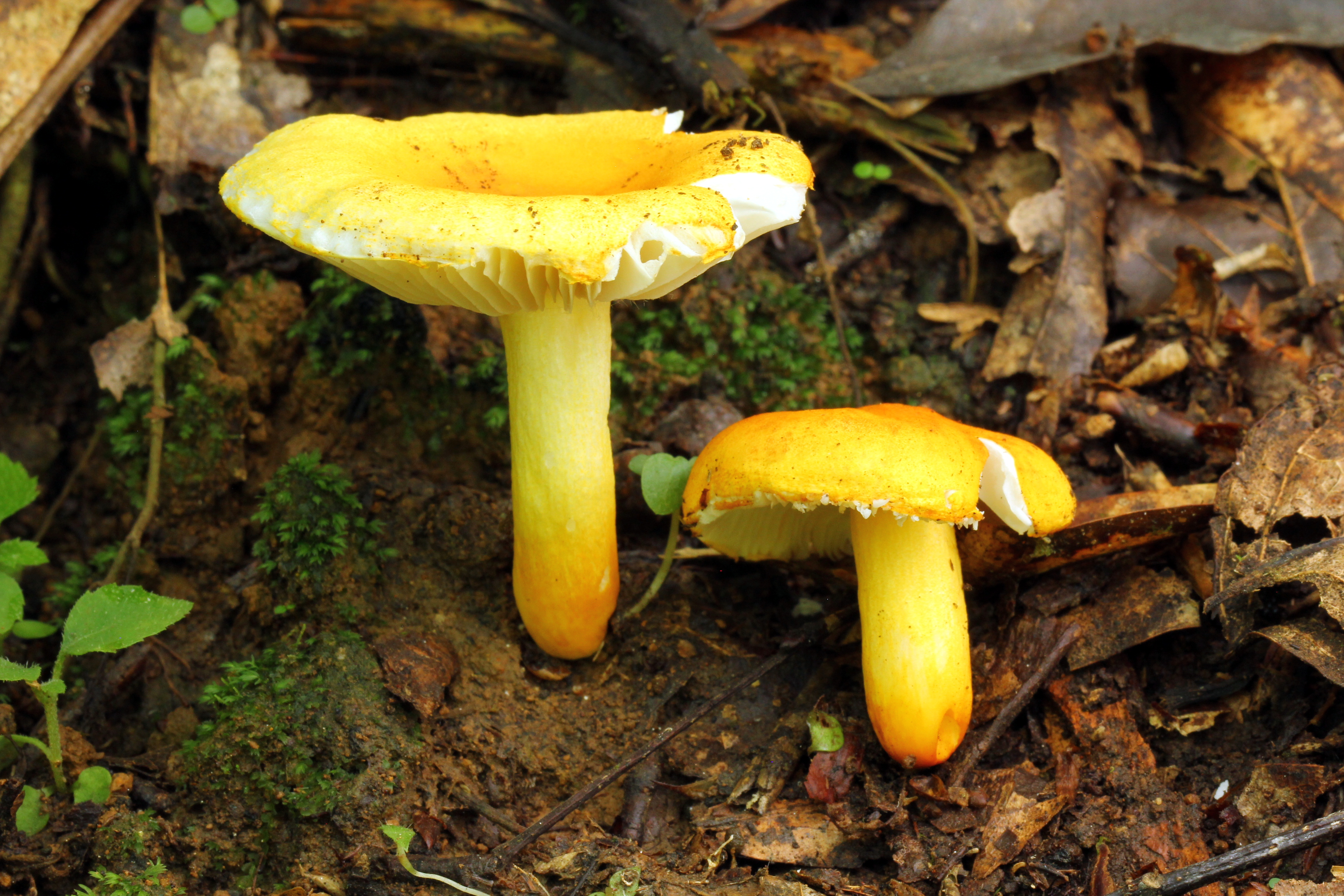

Scientific classification
- Domain: Eukaryota
- Kingdom: Fungi
- Division: Basidiomycota
- Class: Agaricomycetes
- Order: Russulales
- Family: Russulaceae
- Genus: Russula
- Species: R. flavida

Binomial name
- Russula flavida Frost 1880

Synonyms
- Russula mariae var. flavida (Frost) Singer 1940

= Russula flavida =

Species of fungus

Russula flavida is a member of the large mushroom genus Russula.

== Taxonomy ==
It was described in 1880 by American botanist and mycologist Charles Christopher Frost.

A variant, R. flavida var. dhakurianus, was described in 2005 from Kumaon in the Indian Himalaya.

== Description ==
Russula flavida has a bright yellow to orange yellow cap and stipe and white gills. The cap is convex with a central depression and 2.5–8 centimetres (1–3 1/4 in) wide. The stem is 3–7 cm (1 1/4–2 3/4 in) long and 1–2 cm (1/2–3/4 in) thick. The spore print is yellowish-cream.

== Distribution and habitat ==
From June to September, it appears in North America, from eastern Texas to New Hampshire. It is also found in parts of Asia.

It usually surfaces on the ground under hardwood trees.

== Uses ==
The species is edible and contains the pigment russulaflavidin and a related compound.
