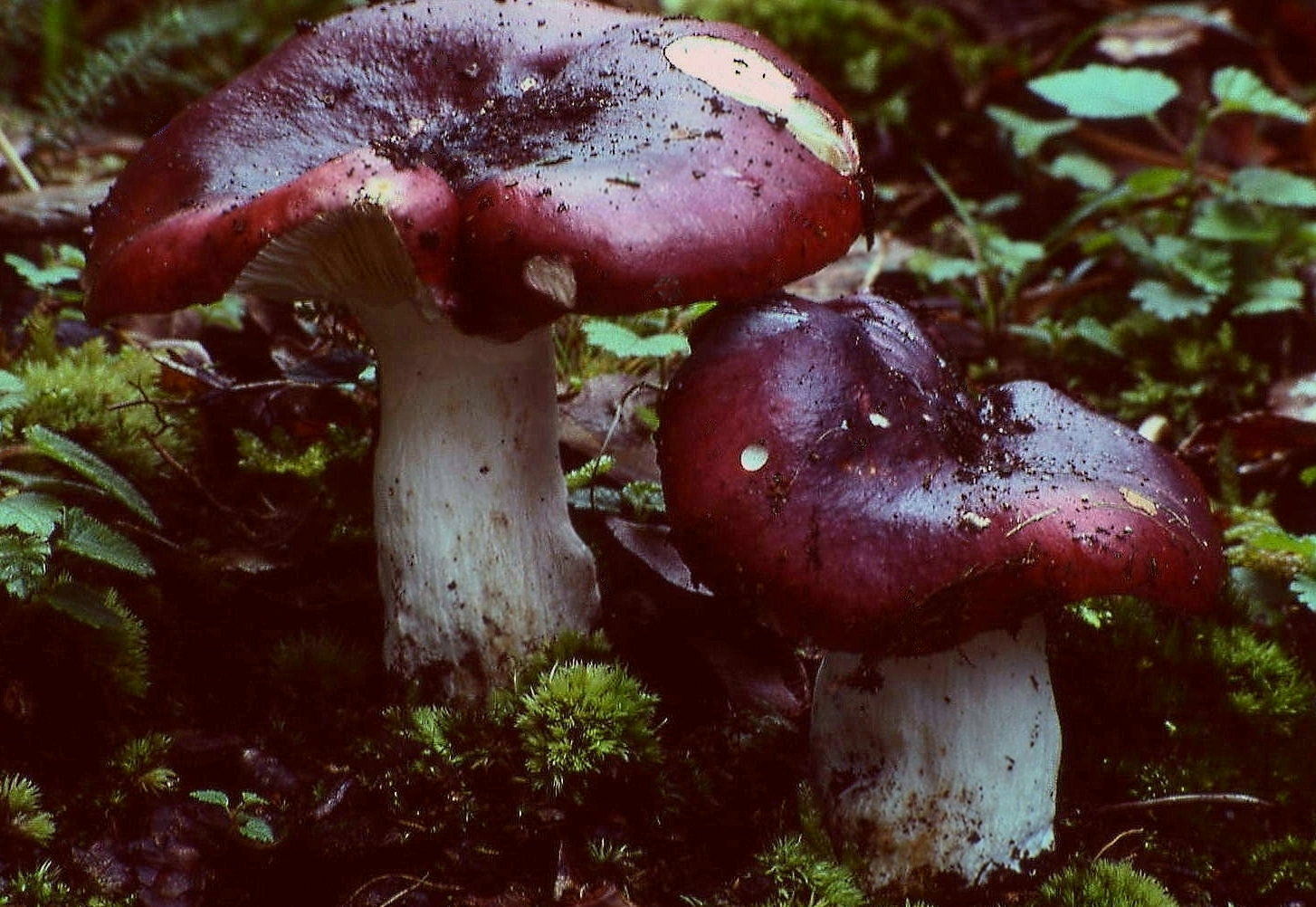

Scientific classification
- Domain: Eukaryota
- Kingdom: Fungi
- Division: Basidiomycota
- Class: Agaricomycetes
- Order: Russulales
- Family: Russulaceae
- Genus: Russula
- Species: R. atropurpurea

Binomial name
- Russula atropurpurea (Krombh.) Britzelm.

Synonyms
- Russula krombholzii Shaffer; Russula undulata Velen.

= Russula atropurpurea =

Russula atropurpurea Mycological characteristics
- Gills on hymenium
- Cap is convex or flat
- Hymenium is adnexed
- Stipe is bare
- Spore print is white
- Ecology is mycorrhizal
- Edibility is edible

Russula atropurpurea is an edible member of the genus Russula. It is dark vinaceous (red wine-coloured) or purple, and grows with deciduous, or occasionally coniferous trees. It is commonly called the blackish purple Russula, or the purple brittlegill.

== Taxonomy ==
Initially described as Agaricus atropurpureus by German naturalist Julius von Krombholz in 1845, and placed in Russula by his countryman Max Britzelmayr in 1893, the binomial name of this mushroom R. atropurpurea (Krombh.) Britzelm is accepted as being incorrect, and mycologists cannot agree on a suitable replacement.

== Distribution and habitat ==
Russula atropurpurea appears in late summer and autumn. It is common in the northern temperate zones, Europe, Asia, and Eastern North America, and is mycorrhizal with oak (Quercus), with which it prefers to live. Favouring acid soil, it is occasionally found with beech (Fagus), or pine (Pinus).

== Description ==
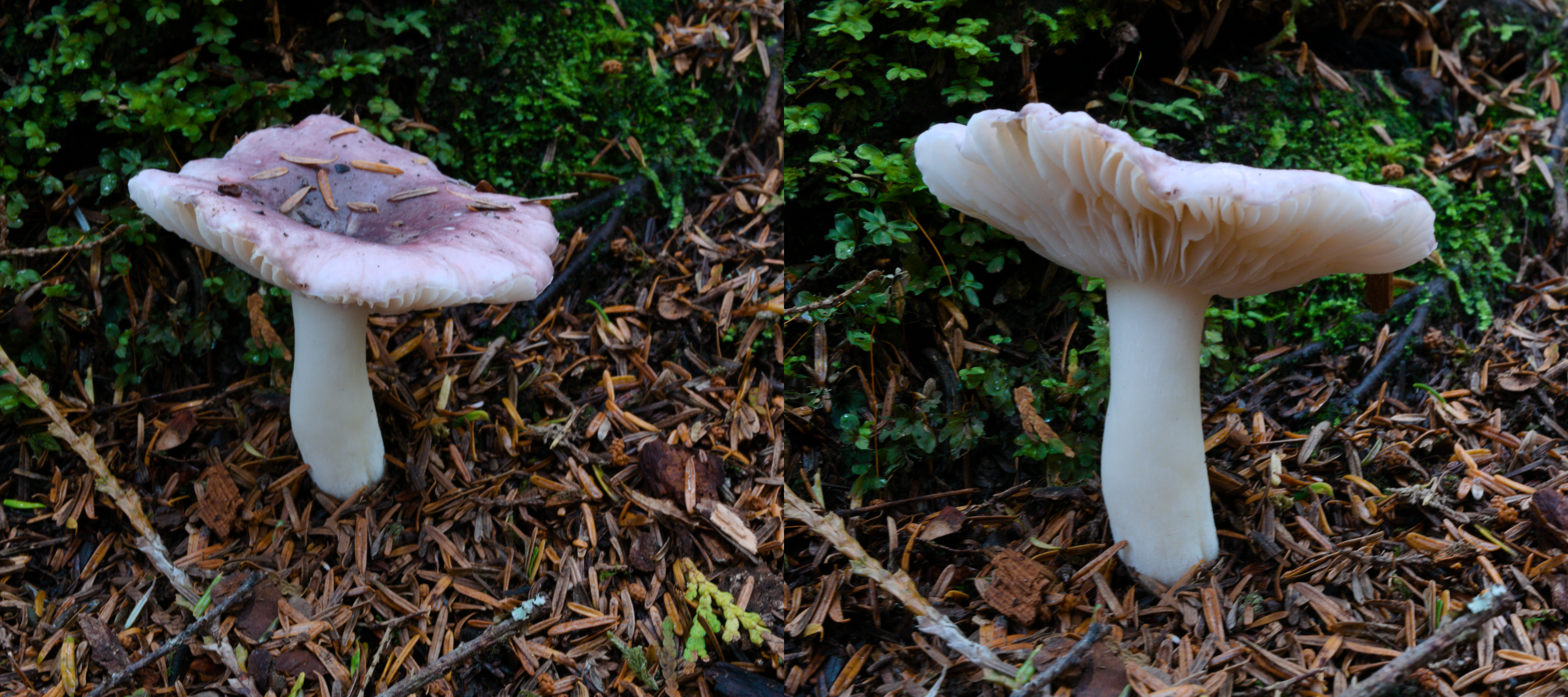
a mature Purple Brittlegill on Kaien Island

The cap is 4–10 cm (1.5–4 in) in diameter. It is dark reddish purple, with a dark; sometimes almost black centre. At first it is convex, but later flattens, and often has a shallow depression. It can also be lighter in colour, or mottled yellowish. The stem is firm, white, and turns grey with age. It measures 3–6 cm in length and 1–2 cm in diameter. The closely set and fairly broad gills are adnexed to almost free, and pale cream, giving a spore print of the same colour. The flesh is white; with a fruity smell, similar to apples. It tastes moderately hot.

The species R. brunneviolacea, and R. romellii are similar, though both have darker spore prints.

As the fruitbodies mature, the caps become concave to collect water during wet weather, and much of the color washes off the rim.

== Spores ==
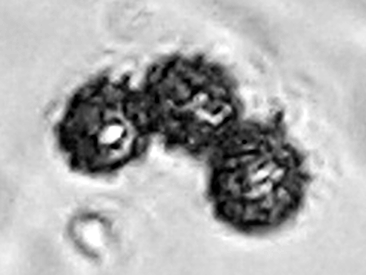
Spores at 800x found in a field in Wales, United Kingdom.

The spore print is Whitish, and the subglobose to globose spores ornamented with warts and ridges measure 7-9 x 6-7 μm.

== Edibility ==
This mushroom is said to be the mildest of the hot-tasting Russula species. It is edible if cooked, although not recommended.

== See also ==
- List of Russula species
