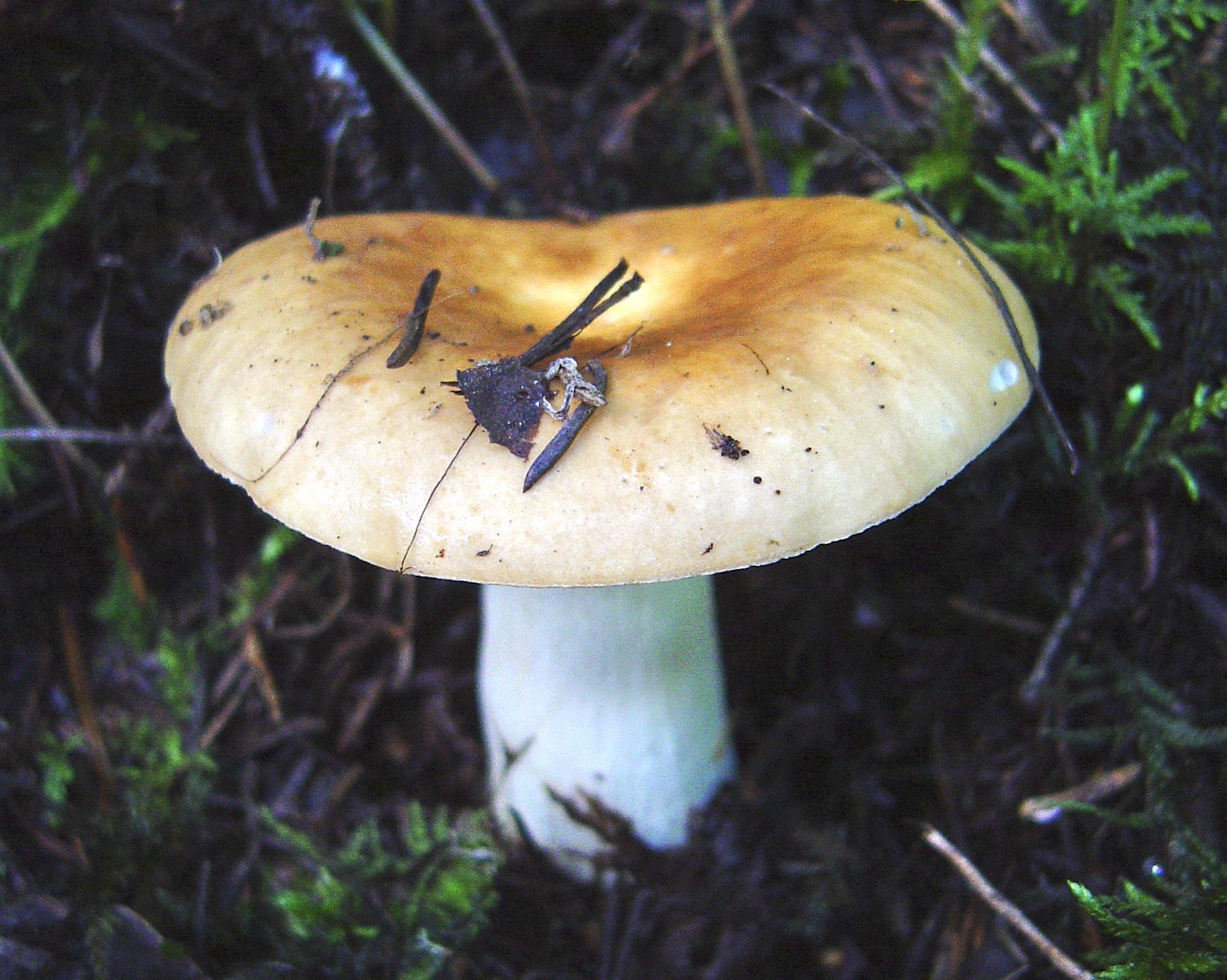

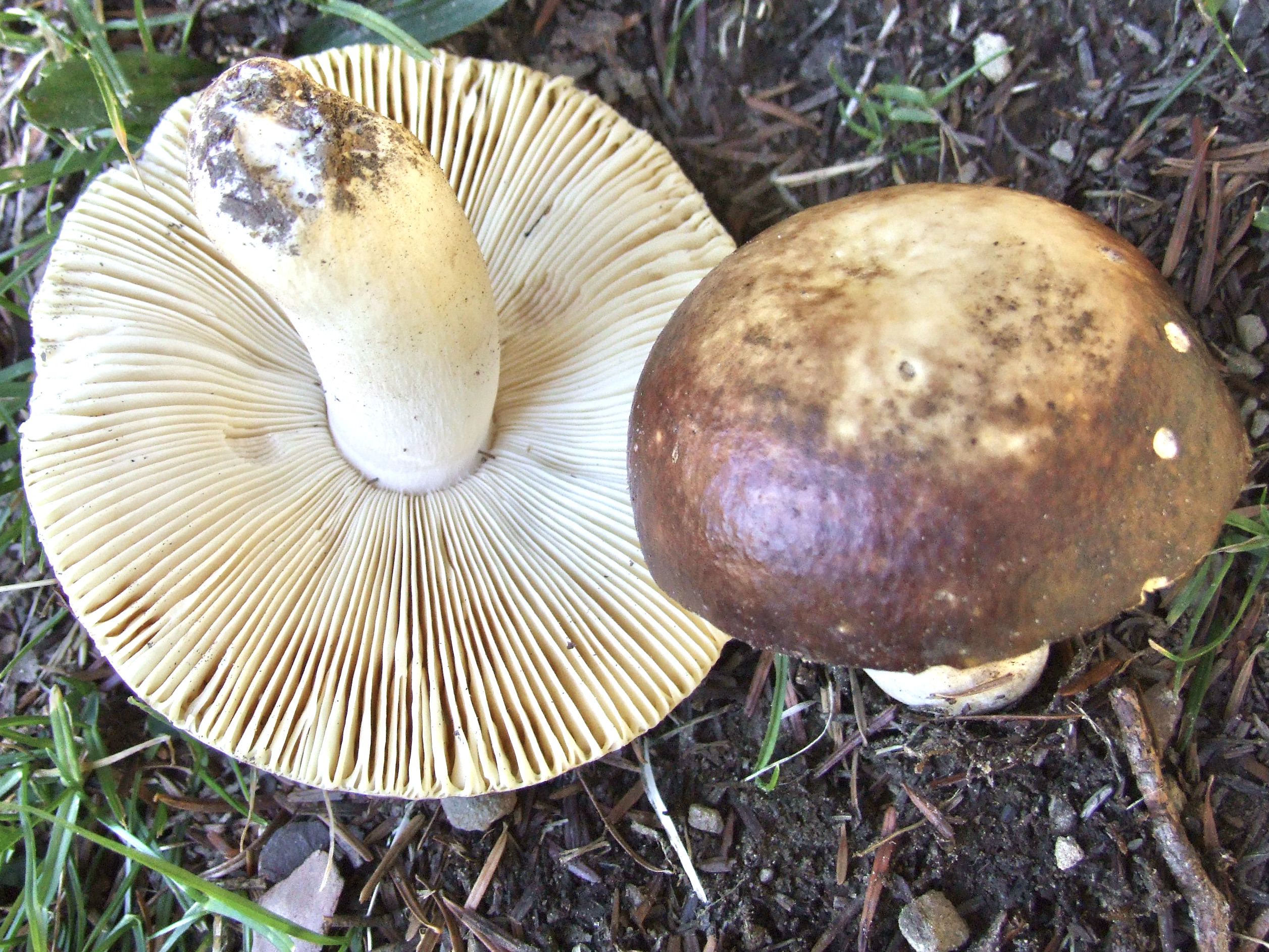

Scientific classification
- Kingdom: Fungi
- Division: Basidiomycota
- Class: Agaricomycetes
- Order: Russulales
- Family: Russulaceae
- Genus: Russula
- Species: R. mustelina

Binomial name
- Russula mustelina Fr.
- Distribution in Europe (green)

= Russula mustelina =

Russet brittlegill

Species of mushroom

Russula mustelina, commonly known as the dense brittlegill or russet brittlegill, is a basidiomycete mushroom of the genus Russula native to Europe and North America. Swedish mycologist Elias Magnus Fries described the species in his 1838 book Epicrisis Systematis Mycologici seu Synopsis Hymenomycetum.

== Description ==
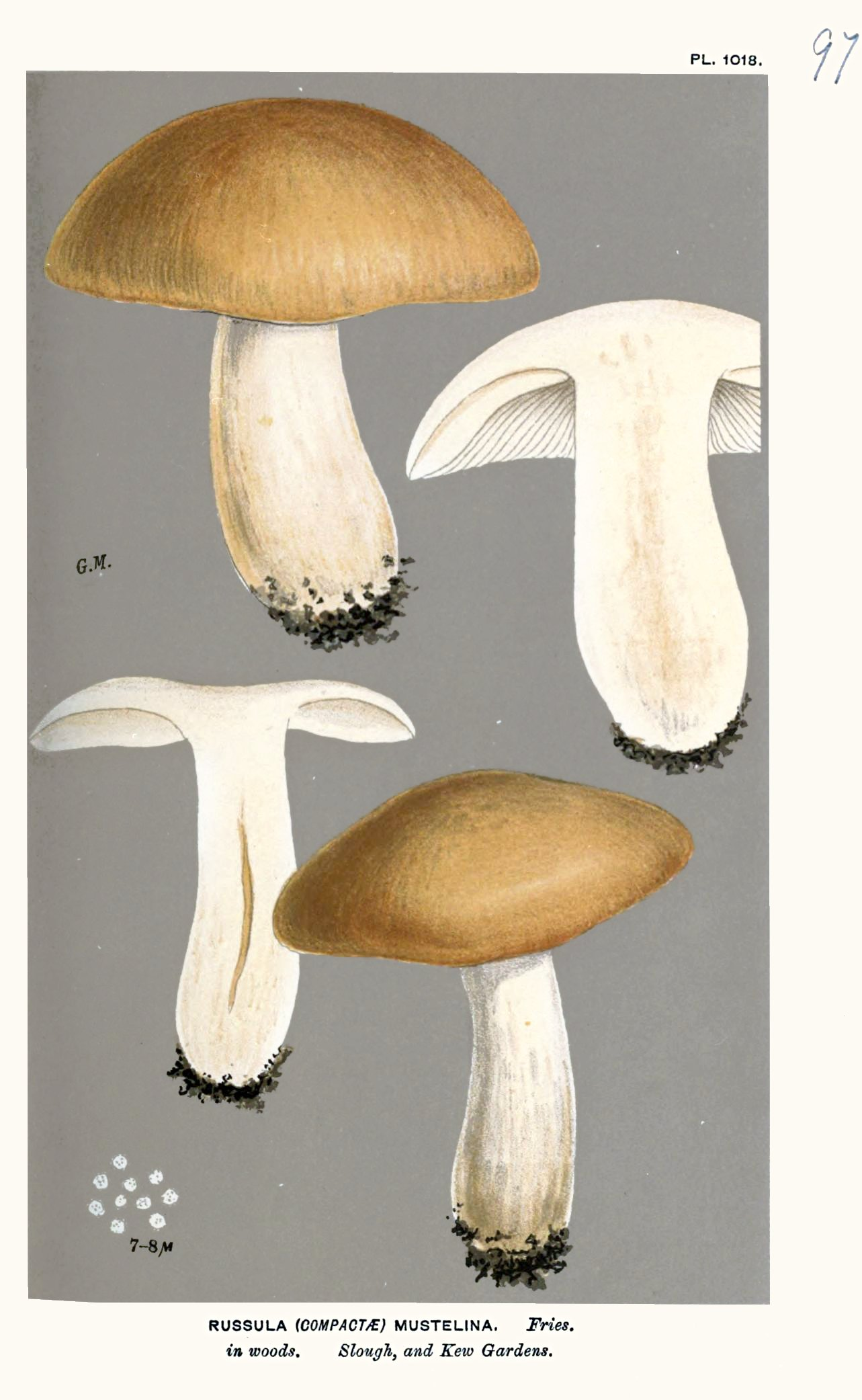
Illustration

The fruit bodies appear in autumn and can be partly submerged in the soil. The cap is 7–12 cm (2.8–4.7 in) wide, occasionally reaching 16 cm (6.3 in), with a shape ranging from convex (in young specimens) to flattened, sometimes with a shallow central depression. The cap surface is dry and can be slightly sticky when wet. The colour is pale yellow to yellow-brown with wine-coloured cap margin and can be discoloured with wine-coloured splotches with age. The white flesh is 3–10 mm (0.1–0.4 in) thick under the cap and has a mild taste. The cream gills have an attachment to the stem ranging from adnate to adnexed. Fruit bodies have almost no odour. The hard white stem measures 4–9 cm (1.6–3.5 in) long by 2–3 cm (0.8–1.2 in) thick, and is roughly the same width throughout its length, although it can be a little thicker near the base. Its surface is dry and smooth.

Russula mustelina produces a yellowish spore print. The roundish spores have dimensions of 7.5–10.5 by 6.5–9 μm, with a reticulate (web-like) and ridged surface marked by occasional warts.

Russula basifurcata is a similar species with smaller fruit bodies associated with oak trees at lower altitudes. The gills are forked near the stem.

== Ecology ==
Russula mustelina occurs in coniferous forests above 1,600 m (5,200 ft) in the Sierra Nevada and Cascade Range in western North America. It is a component of rare peat bog habitat in the eastern Carpathians in Romania, where it is associated with European spruce (Picea abies). It also grows in the Ivory Coast where it is picked and eaten.

== See also ==
Russula mustelina
- Mycological characteristics
- Gills on hymenium
- Cap is convex or depressed
- Hymenium is adnate
- Stipe is bare
- Spore print is yellow
- Edibility is edible

- List of Russula species
