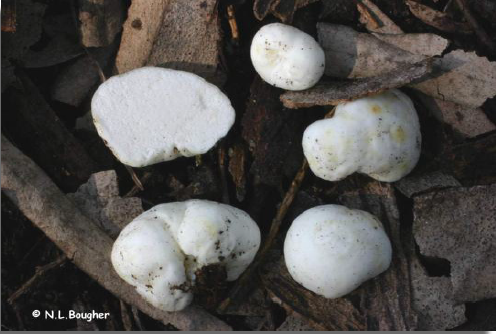

Scientific classification
- Domain: Eukaryota
- Kingdom: Fungi
- Division: Basidiomycota
- Class: Agaricomycetes
- Order: Russulales
- Family: Russulaceae
- Genus: Cystangium
- Species: C. balpineum

Binomial name
- Cystangium balpineum Grgur.

= Cystangium balpineum =

White sessile truffle

Species of fungus

Cystangium balpineum, better known as the white sessile truffle, is a basidiomycete mushroom.

== See also ==
- Truffle
