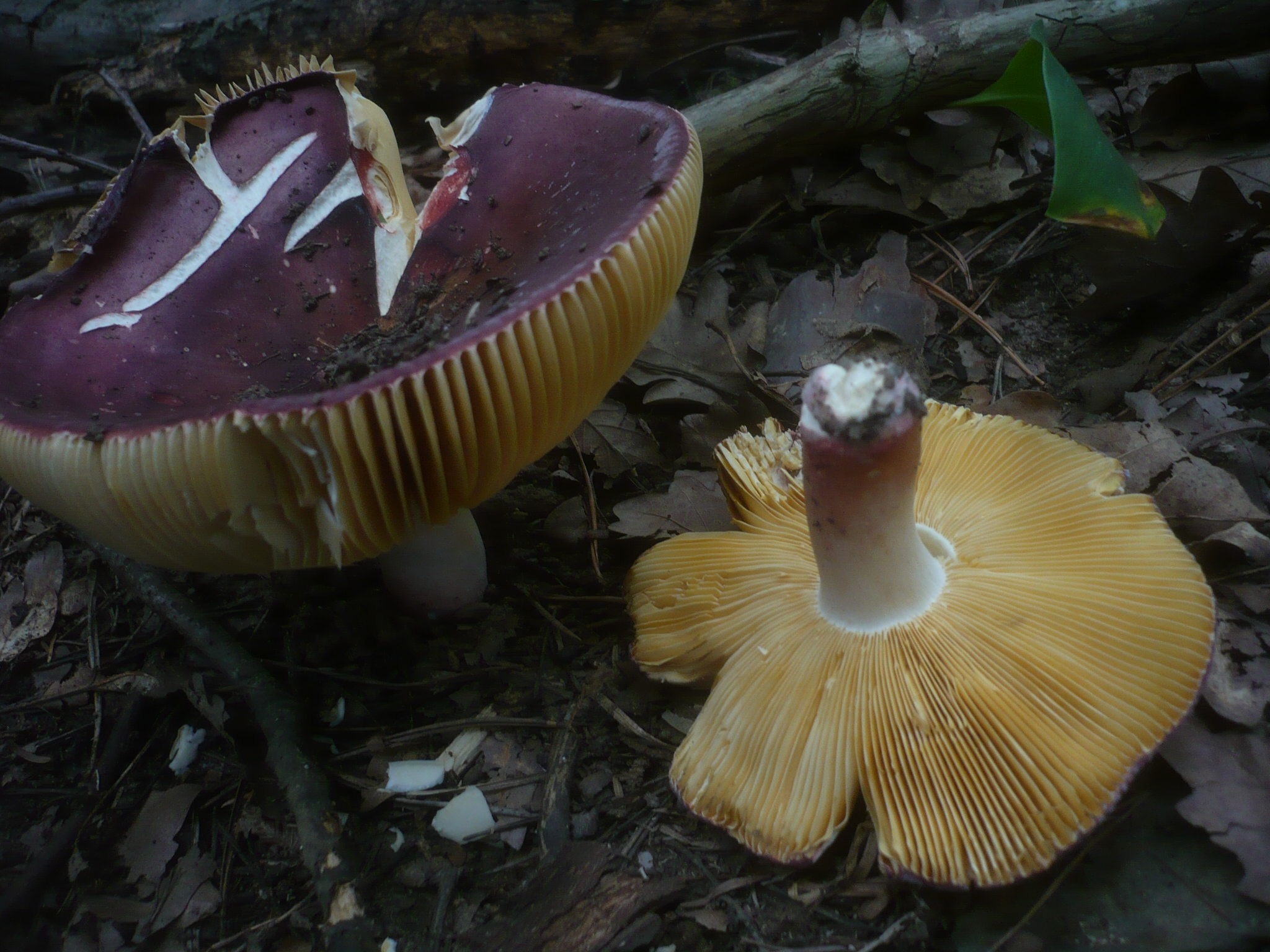

Scientific classification
- Kingdom: Fungi
- Division: Basidiomycota
- Class: Agaricomycetes
- Order: Russulales
- Family: Russulaceae
- Genus: Russula
- Species: R. alutacea

Binomial name
- Russula alutacea (Fr.) Fr. 1838

= Russula alutacea =

Species of fungus

Russula alutacea
- Mycological characteristics
- Gills on hymenium
- Cap is convex or depressed
- Hymenium is adnate or adnexed
- Stipe is bare
- Spore print is yellow
- Ecology is mycorrhizal
- Edibility is unknown but not recommended

Russula albidula is a species of mushroom in the genus Russula. As there are many similar species of varying edibility, its consumption is not advised.
