= Russula prolifica =

Scientific classification
- Domain: Eukaryota
- Kingdom: Fungi
- Division: Basidiomycota
- Class: Agaricomycetes
- Order: Russulales
- Family: Russulaceae
- Genus: Russula
- Species: R. prolifica

Binomial name
- Russula prolifica B.Buyck and V.Hofstetter

Species of fungus

Russula prolifica is a species of edible mushroom found in Madagascar. It is found under Eucalyptus robusta plantations there and has only become abundant in the past seventy years or so.

== See also ==
- List of Russula species
