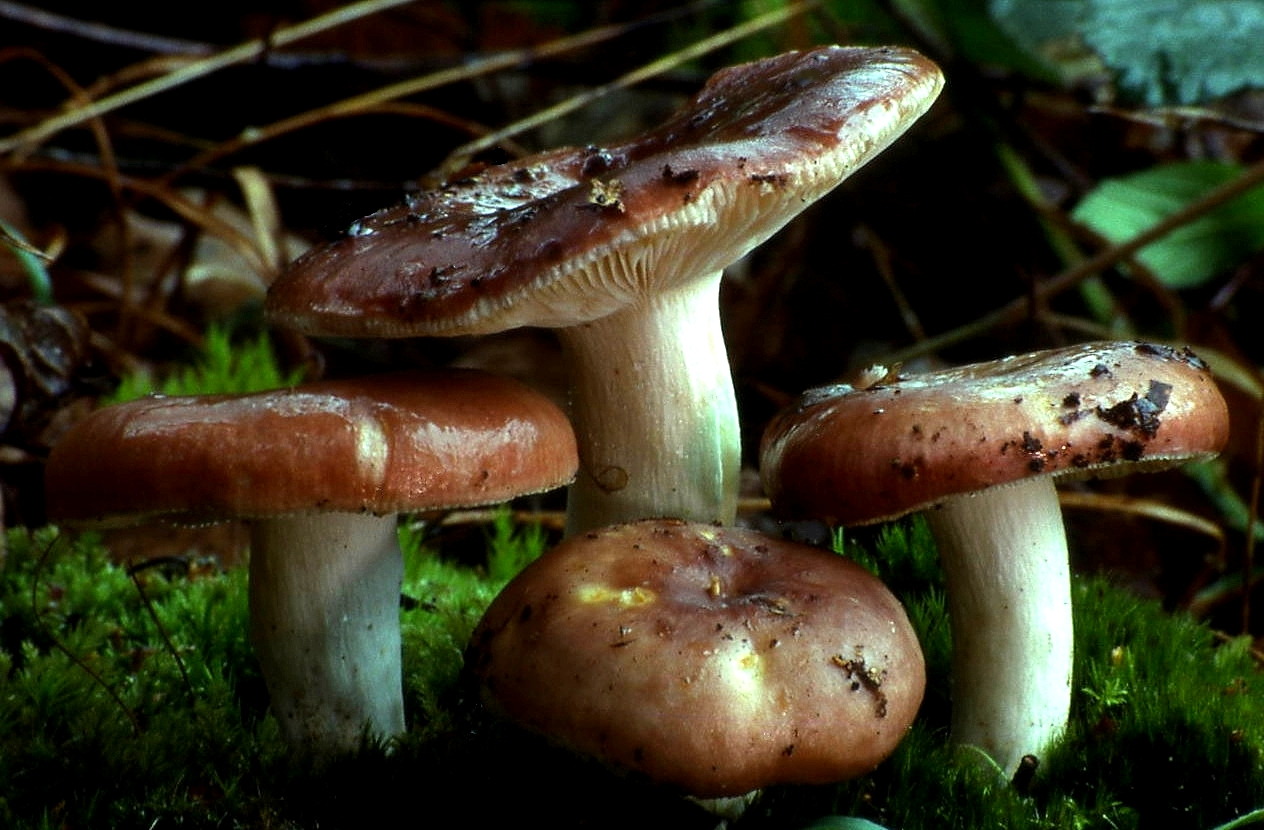

Conservation status
- Least Concern (IUCN 3.1)

Scientific classification
- Kingdom: Fungi
- Division: Basidiomycota
- Class: Agaricomycetes
- Order: Russulales
- Family: Russulaceae
- Genus: Russula
- Species: R. vesca

Binomial name
- Russula vesca Fr. (1836)

= Russula vesca =

Basidiomycete mushroom of the genus Russula

Russula vesca
- Mycological characteristics
- Gills on hymenium
- Cap is convex or flat
- Hymenium is free
- Stipe is bare
- Spore print is white
- Ecology is mycorrhizal
- Edibility is edible

Russula vesca, known by the common names of bare-toothed Russula or the flirt, is a basidiomycete mushroom of the genus Russula.

== Taxonomy ==
Russula vesca was described, and named by the eminent Swedish mycologist Elias Magnus Fries (1794–1878). The specific epithet is the feminine of the Latin adjective vescus, meaning "voracious".

== Description ==
The skin of the cap typically does not reach the margins (resulting in the common names). The cap is 5–10 cm wide, flat, convex, or with slightly depressed centre, weakly sticky, colour brownish to dark brick-red. Taste mild. Gills close apart, white. The stipe narrows toward the base, 2–7 cm long, 1.5–2.5 cm wide, white. It turns deep salmon when rubbed with iron salts (Ferrous sulfate). The spore print is white.

== Distribution and habitat ==
Russula vesca appears in summer or autumn, and grows primarily in deciduous forests in Europe, and North America.

== Edibility ==
Russula vesca is considered edible and good, with a mild nutty flavour. In some countries, including Russia, Ukraine and Finland it is considered entirely edible even in the raw state.

== See also ==
- List of Russula species
