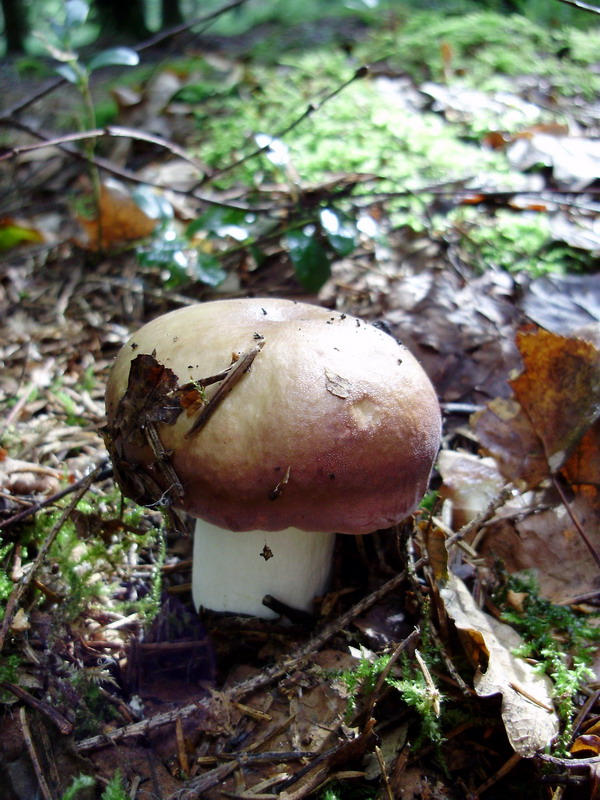

Conservation status
- Secure (NatureServe)

Scientific classification
- Kingdom: Fungi
- Division: Basidiomycota
- Class: Agaricomycetes
- Order: Russulales
- Family: Russulaceae
- Genus: Russula
- Species: R. decolorans

Binomial name
- Russula decolorans Fr., 1838

= Russula decolorans =

Russula decolorans Mycological characteristics
- Gills on hymenium
- Cap is convex or depressed
- Hymenium is adnate or adnexed
- Stipe is bare
- Spore print is yellow to ochre
- Ecology is mycorrhizal
- Edibility is edible but not recommended

Russula decolorans, commonly known as the graying russula, is a Russula mushroom found in forests. Although edible, it resembles several questionable species.

== Description ==
The cap is convex to plane or depressed, red to orange and viscid when moist. The cap grows up to 15 centimetres (6 in) wide and the stalk is up to 12 cm (4 3/4 in) long. The gills are pale, turning yellowish and sometimes staining grayish. The flesh is white and blackens upon bruising; it has a mild taste and odour. The spore print is pale ochre.

== Habitat ==
It grows alone or in groups in mixed woods and under conifer trees.

== Uses ==
The edible mushroom is commonly harvested for food in Finland. However, it is not recommended to eat wild specimens, as it has several lookalikes with unknown edibility.

== See also ==
- List of Russula species
