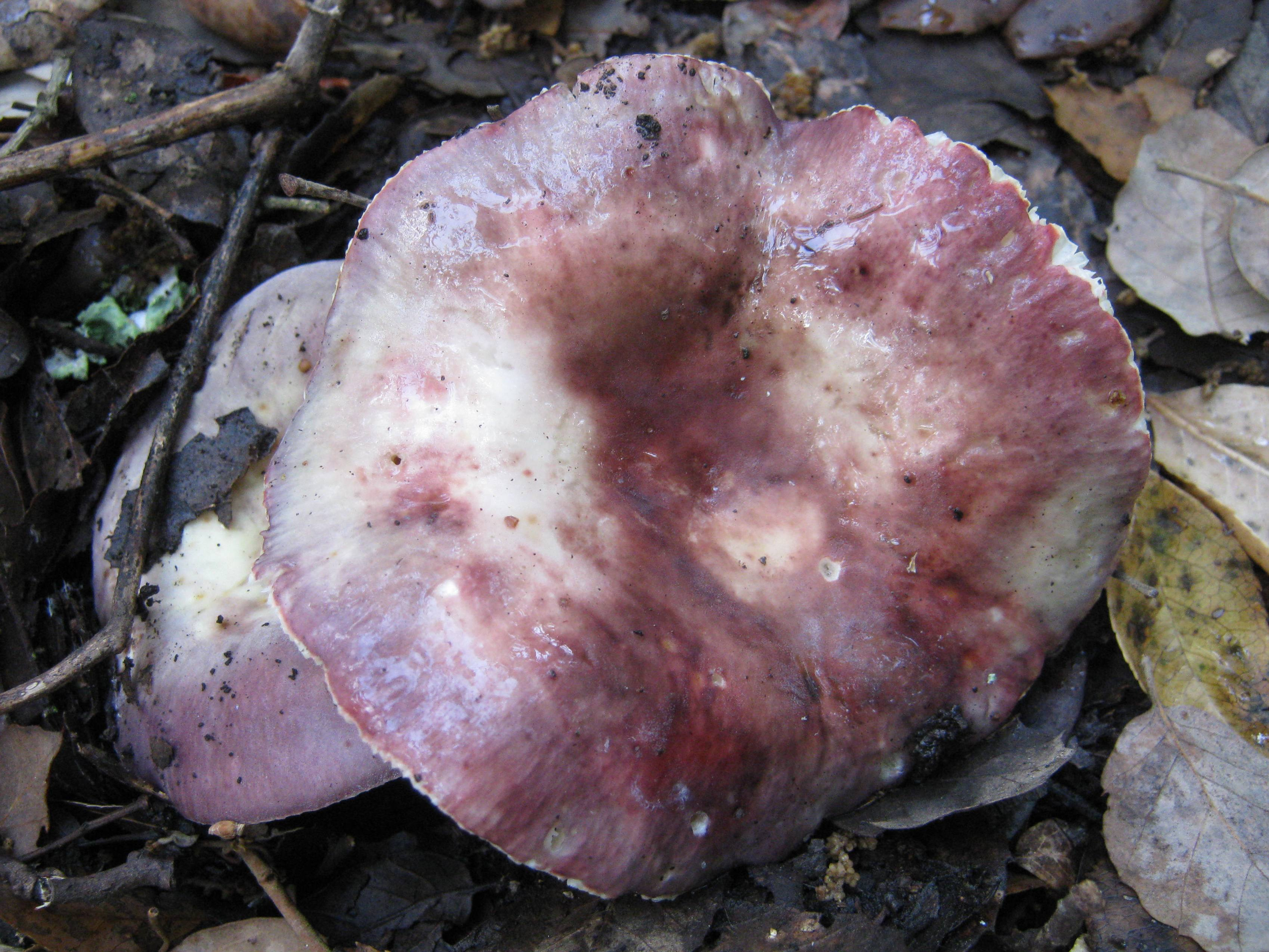

Scientific classification
- Domain: Eukaryota
- Kingdom: Fungi
- Division: Basidiomycota
- Class: Agaricomycetes
- Order: Russulales
- Family: Russulaceae
- Genus: Russula
- Species: R. graveolens

Binomial name
- Russula graveolens Romell (1893)

= Russula graveolens =

Species of fungus

Russula graveolens is an edible species of fungus in the genus Russula. The species was first officially described by Swedish mycologist Lars Romell in 1893.
