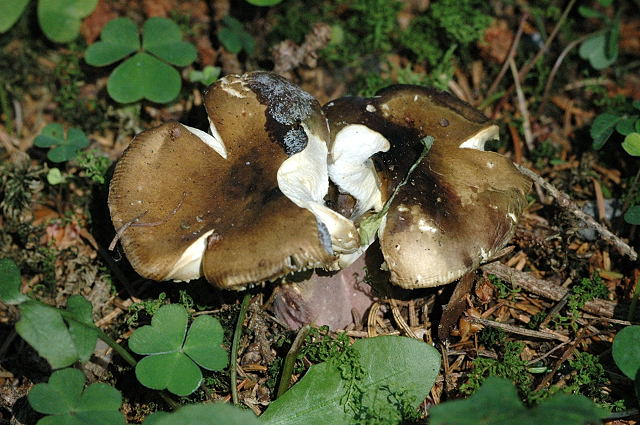

Scientific classification
- Kingdom: Fungi
- Division: Basidiomycota
- Class: Agaricomycetes
- Order: Russulales
- Family: Russulaceae
- Genus: Russula
- Species: R. olivacea

Binomial name
- Russula olivacea (Schaeff.) Fr. 1838

= Russula olivacea =

Species of fungus

Russula olivacea is an edible and non-poisonous Russula mushroom found mostly in groups from June in deciduous and coniferous forests, mainly under spruce and beech; not rare.

== Description ==
The cap is convex when young, soon flat, yellowish-olive when young which develops into rusty brown; it ranges from 10–30 cm (3.9–11.8 in) in diameter. The gills are cream, deep ochre when old and rather crowded and brittle. The spores are yellow. The stem is strong and evenly thick, often pale pink; it ranges from 7–18 cm (2.8–7.1 in) long and 2–6 cm (0.8–2.4 in) wide. The flesh is firm, white, with a pleasant or innocuous scent, and has a mild or nutty taste. Some say it is edible and other say it is toxic, perhaps causing gastrointestinal upset.

== Similar species ==
Russula viscida is in size and habitat very similar; the surface of its cap is bright purple to blood red and shiny. The base turns leather yellow when old. Its flesh is quite pungent.

== See also ==
- List of Russula species
