= Teresa Lebel =

Australian mycologist

- Education: Oregon State University
- Known for: Australian subterranean truffles
- Scientific career
- Fields: Mycology
- Workplaces: State Herbarium of South Australia
- Author abbrev. (botany): T.Lebel

Dr Teresa Lebel is a taxonomist and ecologist who works on fungi, with a particular interest in subterranean truffle-like fungi and their mushroom, bolete, bracket or cup relatives.

== Career ==
Lebel studied at The University of Western Australia (undergraduate and Honours 1989), then Oregon State University (PhD) before taking up a position at the National Herbarium of Victoria as a mycologist (1999-2019), and Editor of Muelleria. During this time, Lebel undertook a two-year sabbatical on the Ross Beever Memorial Fellowship at Manaaki Whenua – Landcare Research (2012-2014). Lebel is currently (2020-) Senior Botanist and Curator Cryptogams at the State Herbarium of South Australia.

The National Herbarium of Victoria holds over 1200 specimens collected by Lebel, the majority truffle-like fungi. Other herbaria in Australia holding her collections include Western Australian Herbarium, State Herbarium of South Australia, New Zealand Fungarium Te Kohinga Hekakeka o Aotearoa, Queensland Herbarium, Australian National Herbarium, Tasmanian Herbarium and the New South Wales Plant Pathology Herbarium.

Research interests include: the taxonomy, systematics, diversity and biogeography of Australian macrofungi, in particular the truffle and truffle-like fungi; the effects of disturbance such as fire, logging, introduced weedy macrofungi, and loss of dispersal agents on macrofungal diversity and community structure; plant-fungal-animal-insect interactions, including ectomycorrhizae, mycophagy and co-evolution and arms-races. Communication of research to the general public, students, educators and managers in intriguing ways.

Lebel has been interviewed about the impact of poisonous mushrooms and the growing awareness of mycology.

== Standard author abbreviation ==
The standard author abbreviation T.Lebel is used to indicate this person as the author when citing a botanical name.

== Selected published names ==
- Cortinarius cinereoroseolus Danks, T.Lebel & Vernes
- See also Category:Taxa named by Teresa Lebel

== Selected publications ==
=== Journal articles ===
Lebel T, Davoodian N, Bloomfield MC, Syme K, May TW, Hosaka K, Castellano MA. (2022). A mixed bag of truffle-like fungi from five different families: Boletaceae, Russulaceae, Psathyrellaceae, Strophariaceae, and Hysterangiaceae. Swainsona 36: 33-65

Cooper JA, Nuytinck J, Lebel T. (2022). Confirming the presence of some introduced Russulaceae species in Australia and New Zealand. Swainsona 36: 9-32.

Boxshall AG, Birch JL, Lebel T, Symonds MRE, Callahan DL. (2021). A field-based investigation into Agaricus xanthodermus (Xanthodermatei) toxicity variation in southern Australia. Mycologia 113(6): 1123-1135. doi:10.1080/00275514.2021.1936851

Davoodian N, Lebel T, Castellano MA, Hosaka K. (2021). Hysterangiales revisited: expanded phylogeny reveals new genera and a new suborder. FUSE 8: 65-80.

Rixon M, Bayly MJ, McLay TGB, Lebel T. (2021). Investigating galling midges (Asphondylia), associated micro fungi and parasitoids in chenopod plant hosts (Amaranthaceae) in south-eastern Australia. Arthropod-Plant Interactions 15: 747-771. doi.org/10.1007/s11829-021-09853-1

Lebel T, Douch J, Tegart L, Vaughan L, Cooper JA, Nuytinck J (21). Untangling the Lactifluus clarkeae - Lf. flocktonae (Russulaceae) species complex in Australasia. Persoonia 47: 1-44

Lebel T, Cooper JA, Castellano MA, Nuytinck J. (2021). Three independent evolutionary events of sequestrate Lactifluus species in Australasia. FUSE 8: 9-25

Plett KL, Kohler A, Lebel T, Singan VR, Bauer D, He G, Ng V, Grigoriev IV, Martin F, Plett JM, Anderson IC (2021). Intra-species genetic variability drives carbon metabolism and symbiotic host interactions in the ectomycorrhizal fungus Pisolithus microcarpus. Environmental Microbiology. 23(4): 2004-2020 https://doi.org/10.1111/1462-2920.15320

Davoodian, N., Jackson, C.J., Holmes, G.D., Lebel, T. (2020). Continental‐scale metagenomics, BLAST searches, and herbarium specimens: The Australian Microbiome Initiative and the National Herbarium of Victoria. Applications In Plant Sciences 8(9) doi:10.1002/aps3.11392

Lebel T, Pennycook S, Barrett M. (2018). Two new species of Pisolithus (Sclerodermataceae) from Australasia, and an assessment of the confused nomenclature of P. tinctorius. Phytotaxa 348(3):163-186

Orihara T, Lebel T, Ge Z-W, Smith ME, Maekawa N. (2017). Evolutionary history of the sequestrate genus Rossbeevera (Boletaceae) reveals a new genus Turmalinea and highlights the utility of ITS minisatellite-like insertions for molecular identification. Persoonia 37: 173-198

Sheedy E, Matheny B, Lebel T, May TW, Martin B. (2016). Dating the emergence of 13 major lineages of sequestrate basidiomycete fungi in Australia using an augmented meta-analysis. Australian Systematic Botany 29, 284–302

Dickie I, Nuñez MA, Pringle A, Lebel T, Tourtellot SG, Johnston PR. (2016). Can invasive ectomycorrhizal fungi be eradicated, and how? Biological Invasions doi:10.1007/s10530-016-1243-x

Vellinga EC, Kuyper TW, Ammirati J, Desjardin DE, Halling RE, Justo A, Læssøe T, Lebel T, Lodge DL, Matheny PB, Methven AS, Moreau P-A, Mueller GM, Noordeloos ME, Nuytinck J, Ovrebo CL, Verbeken A. (2015). Six simple guidelines for introducing new genera of Fungi. IMA Fungus 6(2): 65-68

Lebel T, Beever RE†, Castellano MA. (2015). Cryptic diversity in the sequestrate genus Stephanospora (Stephanosporaceae) in Australasia. Fungal Biology, 119, 201-228.

Lebel T, Dunk CW, May TW. (2013). Rediscovery of Multifurca stenophylla (Berk.) T.Lebel, C.W.Dunk & T.W.May comb. nov. (Russulaceae) from Australia. Mycological Progress 12, 497–504.

Lebel T, Vellinga EC. (2013) Description and affinities of a sequestrate Lepiota (Agaricaceae) from Australia. Mycological Progress 12, 525–532

Danks M, Lebel T, Vernes K. (2010). ‘Cort short on a mountaintop’ – Eight new species of sequestrate Cortinarius from sub-alpine Australia and affinities to sections within the genus. Persoonia 24: 106–126

Newbound M, McCarthy M, Lebel T. (2010). ‘Fungi and the urban environment: a review’. Landscape and Urban Planning 96 (3): 138-145.

Catcheside P, Lebel T. (2009). The truffle genus Cribbea (Physalacriaceae, Agaricales) in Australia. Australian Systematic Botany. 22(1), 39-55.

Moore D, Pöder R, Molitoris PH, Money NP, Figlas D, Lebel T (2006). Crisis in teaching future generations about fungi. Mycological Research 110: 625-627.

Lebel T.(2003). Australasian Truffle-like Fungi XV. Cystangium. Aust. Syst. Bot.16(3): 371-400.

Smith JE, Molina R, Huso MMP, Luoma DL, McKay D, Castellano MA, Lebel T, Valachovic Y (2002). Species richness, abundance, and composition of hypogeous and epigeous ectomycorrhizal fungal sporocarps in young, rotation-age, and old-growth stands of Douglas-fir (Pseudotsuga menziesii) in the Cascade Range of Oregon, USA. Canadian Journal of Botany. 80: 186-204.

Lebel T, Castellano MA (2002). Type studies of sequestrate Russulales. Part II. Species related to Russula from Australia and New Zealand. Mycologia. 94(2): 327-354

Bougher N, Lebel T. (2001). Sequestrate (Truffle-like) Fungi of Australia and New Zealand. Aust. Syst. Bot. 14: 439-484.

Lebel T, Castellano MA. (1999). Australian truffle-like fungi. IX. History and current trends in the study of the taxonomy of sequestrate macrofungi from Australia and New Zealand. Australian Systematic Botany. 12: 803-817

Scheibling RE, Evans T, Mulvay P, Lebel T, Williamson D, Holland S. (1990). Commensalism between an epizoic limpet, Patelloida nigrosulcata, and its gastropod hosts, Haliotis roei and Patella laticostata, on intertidal reef platforms off Perth, Western Australia. Aust. J. Mar. Fresh. Res. 41: 647-55.
