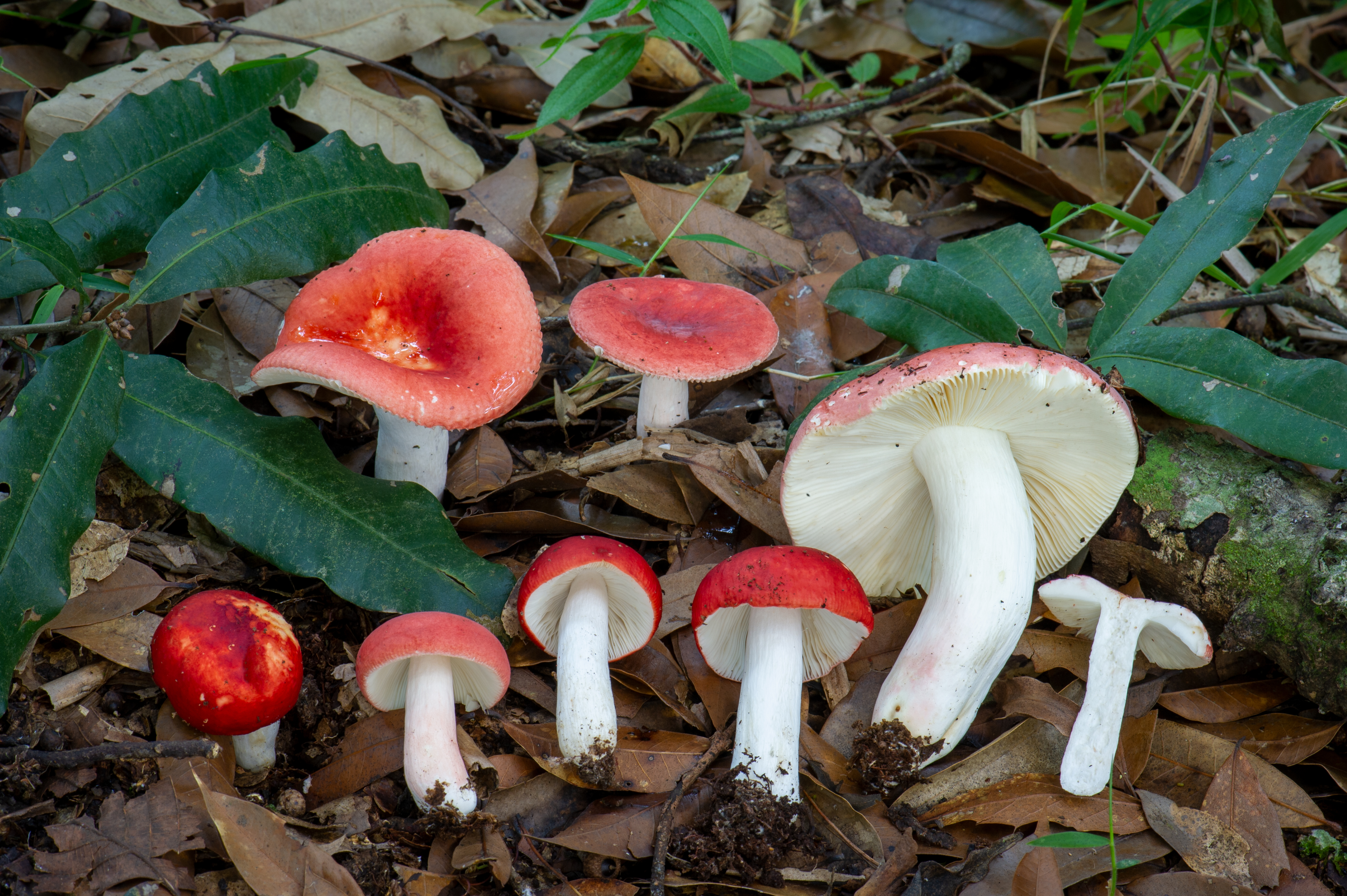
- The sickener (R. emetica group)

Scientific classification
- Kingdom: Fungi
- Division: Basidiomycota
- Class: Agaricomycetes
- Order: Russulales
- Family: Russulaceae
- Genus: Russula; Pers. (1797)

Type species
- Russula emetica (Schaeff.) Pers. (1796)

Diversity
- c. 700 species

Synonyms
- Agaricus trib. Russula (Pers.) Fr. (1821); Bucholtzia Lohwag (1924); ?Cystangium Singer & A.H.Sm. (1960); Dixophyllum Earle (1909); Elasmomyces Cavara 1898; Gymnomyces Massee & Rodway (1898); Lactarelis Earle (1909); Macowanites Kalchbr. (1882); Martellia Mattir. (1900); Omphalomyces Battarra ex Earle (1909); Phaeohygrocybe Henn. (1901); Russulina J.Schröt. (1889)

= Russula =

Genus of fungi

Russula is a very large genus composed of around 750 worldwide species of fungi. The genus was described by Christian Hendrik Persoon in 1796.

The mushrooms are fairly large, and brightly colored – making them one of the most recognizable genera among mycologists and mushroom collectors. Their distinguishing characteristics include usually brightly coloured caps, a white to dark yellow spore print, brittle, attached gills, an absence of latex, and absence of partial veil or volva tissue on the stem. Microscopically, the genus is characterised by the amyloid ornamented spores and flesh (trama) composed of spherocysts. Members of the related genus Lactarius have similar characteristics but emit a milky latex when their gills are broken.

The ectomycorrhizal mushrooms are typically common. Although some species are toxic, a number of others are edible.

== Taxonomy ==
Christian Hendrik Persoon first circumscribed the genus Russula in his 1796 work Observationes Mycologicae, and considered the defining characteristics to be the fleshy fruit bodies, depressed cap, and equal gills. He reduced it to the rank of tribe in the genus Agaricus in 1801. Elias Fries similarly regarded Russula as a tribe of Agaricus in his influential Systema Mycologicum (1821), but later (1825) raised it to the rank of genus in the Systema Orbis Vegetabilis. Around the same time, Samuel Frederick Gray also recognized Russula as a genus in his 1821 work The Natural Arrangement of British Plants. The name Russula is derived from the Latin word russus, meaning "red".

=== Sequestrate species ===
The description of Russula was changed in 2007 when molecular analysis revealed that several sequestrate species formerly classified in Macowanites (syn. Elasmomyces) were shown to lie within Russula. The type species of Macowanites, Macowanites agaricinus, was transferred and several new species were added: Russula albidoflava, R. albobrunnea, R. brunneonigra, R. galbana, R. pumicoidea, R. reddellii, R. sinuata, and R. variispora. The genus names Gymnomyces and Martellia, formerly used for sequestrate species, are now accepted synonyms of Russula, The genus Cystangium is also probably a synonym of Russula but is still in use.

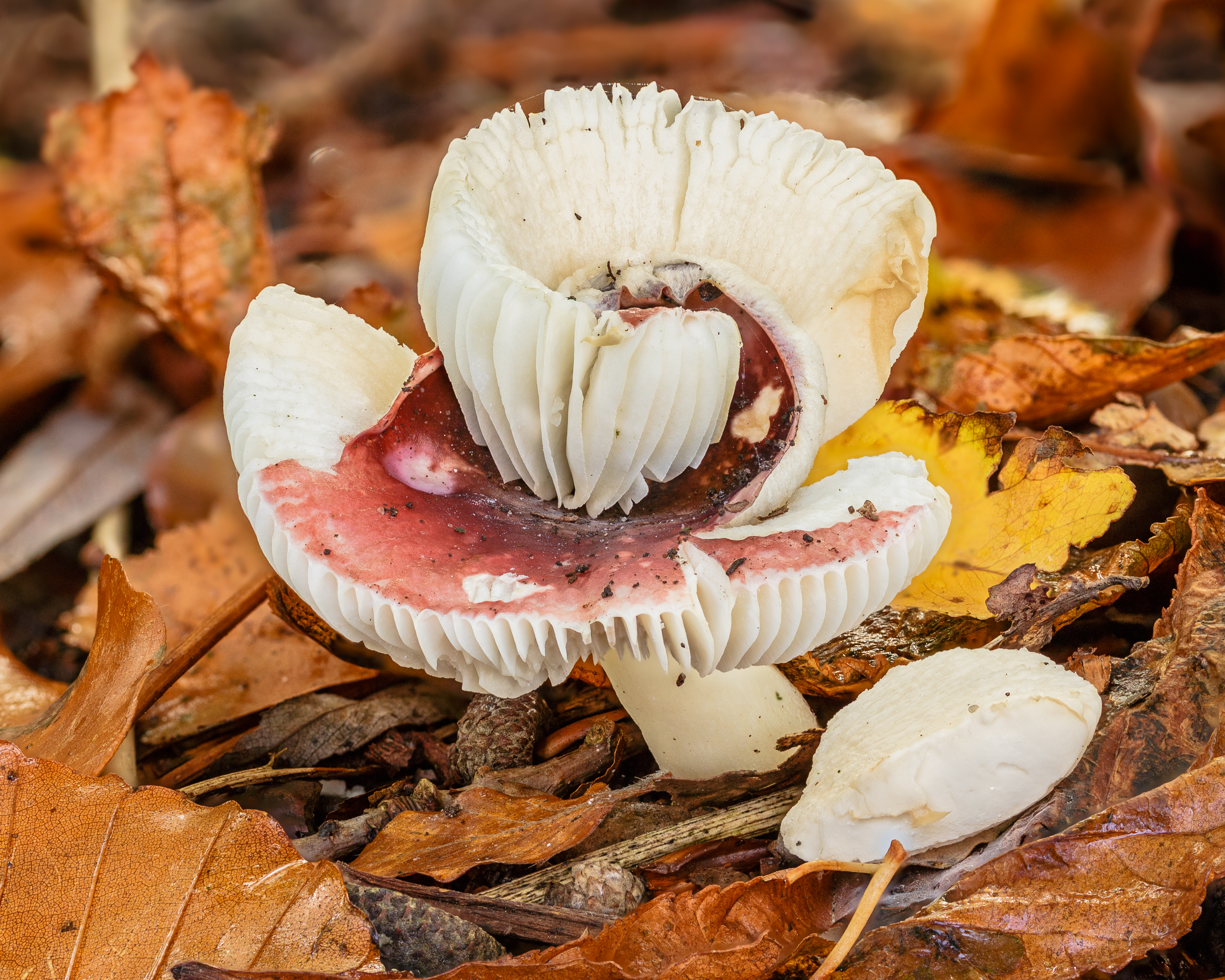
Oddly shaped Russula in decline.

== Identification ==
"If we know of any one, who in the pride of intellect spurned all mental tasks as mere play, we would tame him by insisting on his mastering, classifying and explaining the synonyms of the genus Russula."

— Anna Maria Hussey, Illustrations of British mycology, 1855

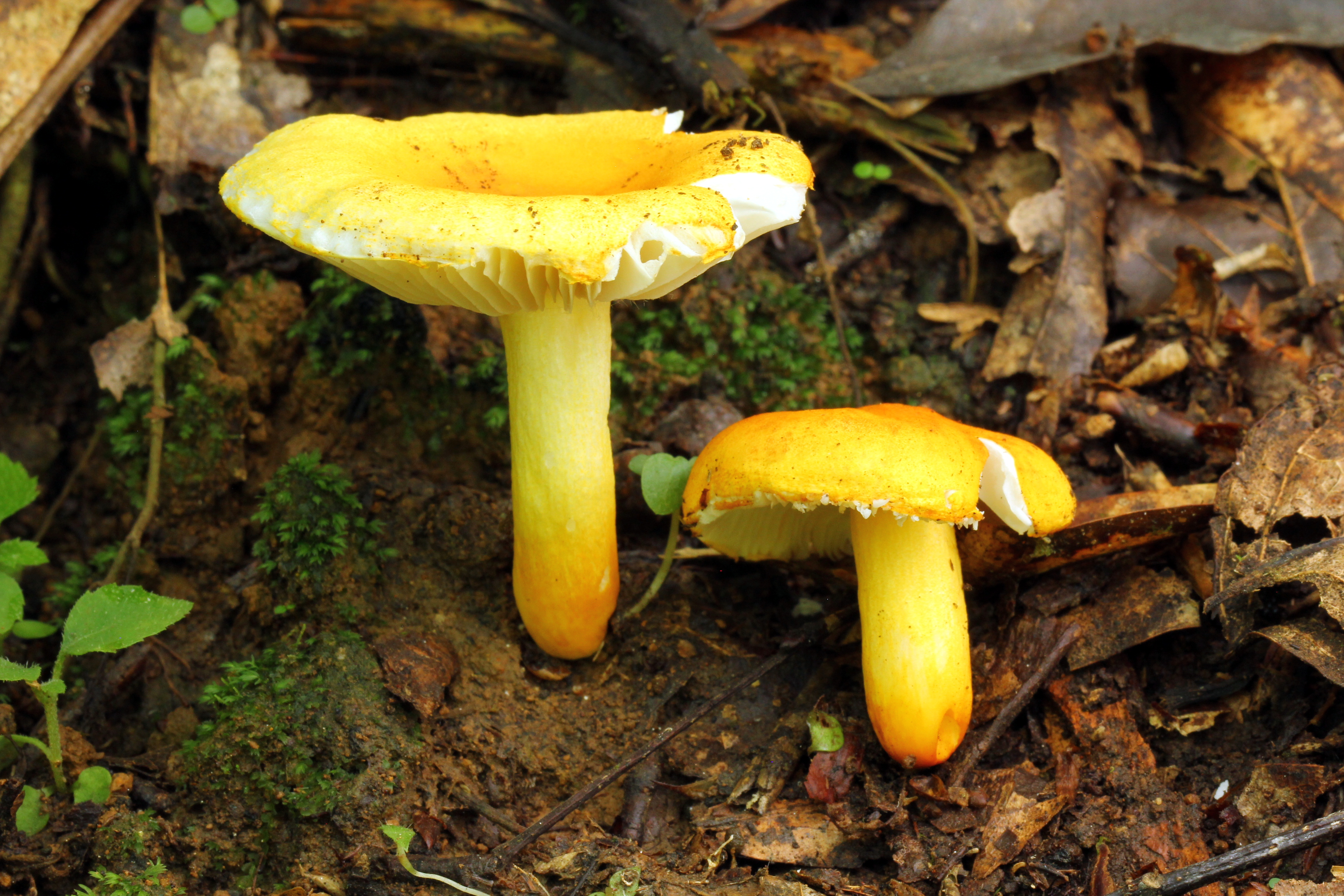
R. flavida, Mexico

Like the genus Lactarius, russulas have a distinctive flesh consistency, which is also reflected in the appearance of the gills and stipe, and normally makes them immediately recognizable. They have no trace of a veil (no ring, or veil remnants on the cap). The gills are brittle except in a few cases, and cannot be bent parallel with the cap without breaking. Hence the genus Russula is sometimes known colloquially as "brittle gills". They have splitting gills and do not exude a milky substance at cut surfaces, contrary to the genus Lactarius. Presence of large spherical cells, 'sphaerocysts', in the stipe is an important characteristic feature to distinguish the members of Russulaceae from other mushrooms. In Russula, the stipe breaks like the flesh of an apple, while in most other families it only breaks into fibres. The spore powder varies from white to cream, or even orange.

While it is relatively easy to identify a sample mushroom as belonging to this genus, it is a significant challenge to distinguish member species of Russula. This task often requires microscopic characteristics, and subtle subjective distinctions, such as the difference between a mild to bitter and a mild to acrid flavor. Moreover, the exact phylogenetic relationships of these mushrooms have yet to be resolved in the professional mycological community, and may ultimately depend on DNA sequencing analysis.

The following characteristics are often important in identifying individual species:

- the exact colour of the spore powder (white/cream/ochre),
- the taste (mild/bitter/acrid),
- colour changes in the flesh,
- the distance from the centre to which the cap skin can be pulled off: (peeling percentage).
- cap colour (but this is often very variable within one species),
- reaction of the flesh to ferrous sulphate (FeSO_{4}), formalin, alkalis, and other chemicals,
- ornamentation of the spores, and
- other microscopic characteristics, such as the appearance of the cystidia in various mounting reagents.

Despite the difficulty in positively identifying collected specimens, the possibility to spot the toxic species by their acrid taste makes some of the mild species, such as R. cyanoxantha and R. vesca, popular edible mushrooms. Russula is mostly free of deadly poisonous species, and mild-tasting ones are all edible.

== Ecology ==
All Russula species are ectomycorrhizal symbionts with higher plants and trees, and the genus has a collectively diverse host range. Some species are cosmopolitan and capable of forming associations with one or more hosts in a range of habitats, while others are more constrained in either host or habitat or both. The mycoheterotrophic plant Monotropa uniflora associates with a small range of fungal hosts, all of them members of Russulaceae, including 18 species of Russula.

Russula fruit bodies provide a seasonal food source for slugs, squirrels and deer.

Some russulas can bioaccumulate high levels of toxic metals from their environment. For example, Russula atropurpurea is capable of concentrating zinc, a property attributed to the presence of metallothionein-like peptides in the mushroom. Russula nigricans can accumulate lead to a level up to five times more concentrated than the soil it grows in, while R. ochroleuca concentrates environmental mercury.

Fungi of this genus have been recorded as a main food of the pleasing fungus beetle Tritoma angulata. The related T.biguttata is also occasionally found on Russula, but it does not seem to be a regular food source for them.

== Toxicity ==
The main pattern of toxicity seen among Russula species to date has been gastrointestinal symptoms in those with a spicy (acrid) taste when eaten raw or undercooked; many of these are red-capped species such as R. emetica, R. sardonia and R. nobilis. The Asian species Russula subnigricans has been the cause of several fatal cases of rhabdomyolysis in Japan. Several active agents have been isolated from the species, including russuphelin A and cycloprop-2-ene carboxylic acid.

== Edibility ==
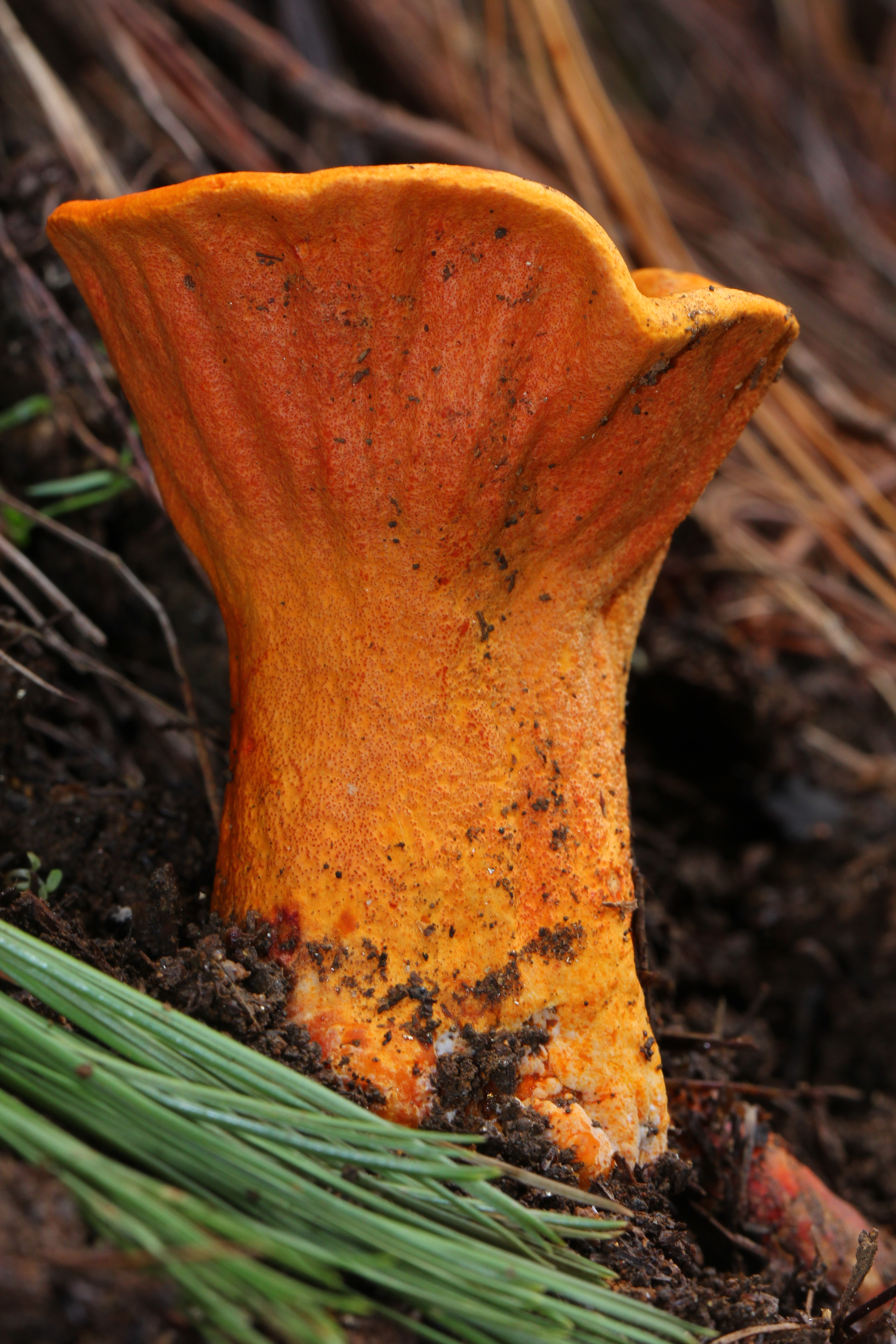
Lobster mushroom

Humans collect several species of Russula for food. There is a cultural divide toward interpretation of Russula edibility. In general, North American field guides tend to list mostly non-edible species and advise caution when consuming any member of the genus. In contrast, European field guides have a more favorable opinion and list more edible species.

In the Pacific Northwest region of North America, only Russula brevipes parasitized with Hypomyces lactifluorum—known as lobster mushroom—is collected commercially. Several Russula species are sold in the markets of Izta-Popo Zoquiapan National Park (central Mexico): R. brevipes, R. cyanoxantha, R. mexicana and R. olivacea. In Tlaxcala, wild species sold in market include R. alutacea, R. cyanoxantha, R. delica, R. mariae, R. olivacea, R. romagnesia, and R. xerampelina.

In Madagascar, species collected from introduced eucalypt forests include Russula madecassense, Russula prolifica, and several other species of minor importance, including some that have not yet been officially described. Russula is the most commonly consumed and economically important mushroom genus in Madagascar, particularly Russula prolifica and Russula edulis. This and other edible Russula are typically stripped of their cap cuticle before selling to make them more similar in appearance to the Agaricus bisporus. In Tanzania, Russula cellulata and Russula ciliata are sometimes used as food.

Russula cyanoxantha is a popular edible throughout Asia, Europe, and the Pacific. In Finland, commonly eaten species include (but are not limited to) Russula vinosa, Russula vesca, Russula paludosa, Russula decolorans, Russula xerampelina and Russula claroflava.

In Thailand, russulas collected by locals and sold in roadsides and local markets include Russula alboareolata, Russula lepida, Russula nigricans, Russula virescens, and Russula xerampelina. Edible russulas in Nepal include Russula flavida and Russula chlorides. The tropical Chinese species Russula griseocarnosa, misidentified as the European R. vinosa until 2009, is commercially collected as food and medicine.

== Natural products ==
Despite the large number of species, the secondary metabolites of Russula have not been well investigated, especially compared to Lactarius. Russula foetens was shown to produce the marasmane sesquiterpenes Lactapiperanol A and Lactapiperanol E. A novel lectin with potent in vitro antitumor activity was isolated from Russula rosea, the first lectin reported from a Russula. This mushroom is also the source of the sesquiterpenes rulepidanol and rulepidadienes A and B. Russula nigricans contains the compound nigricanin, the first ellagic acid derivative isolated from higher fungi.

== Notable species ==
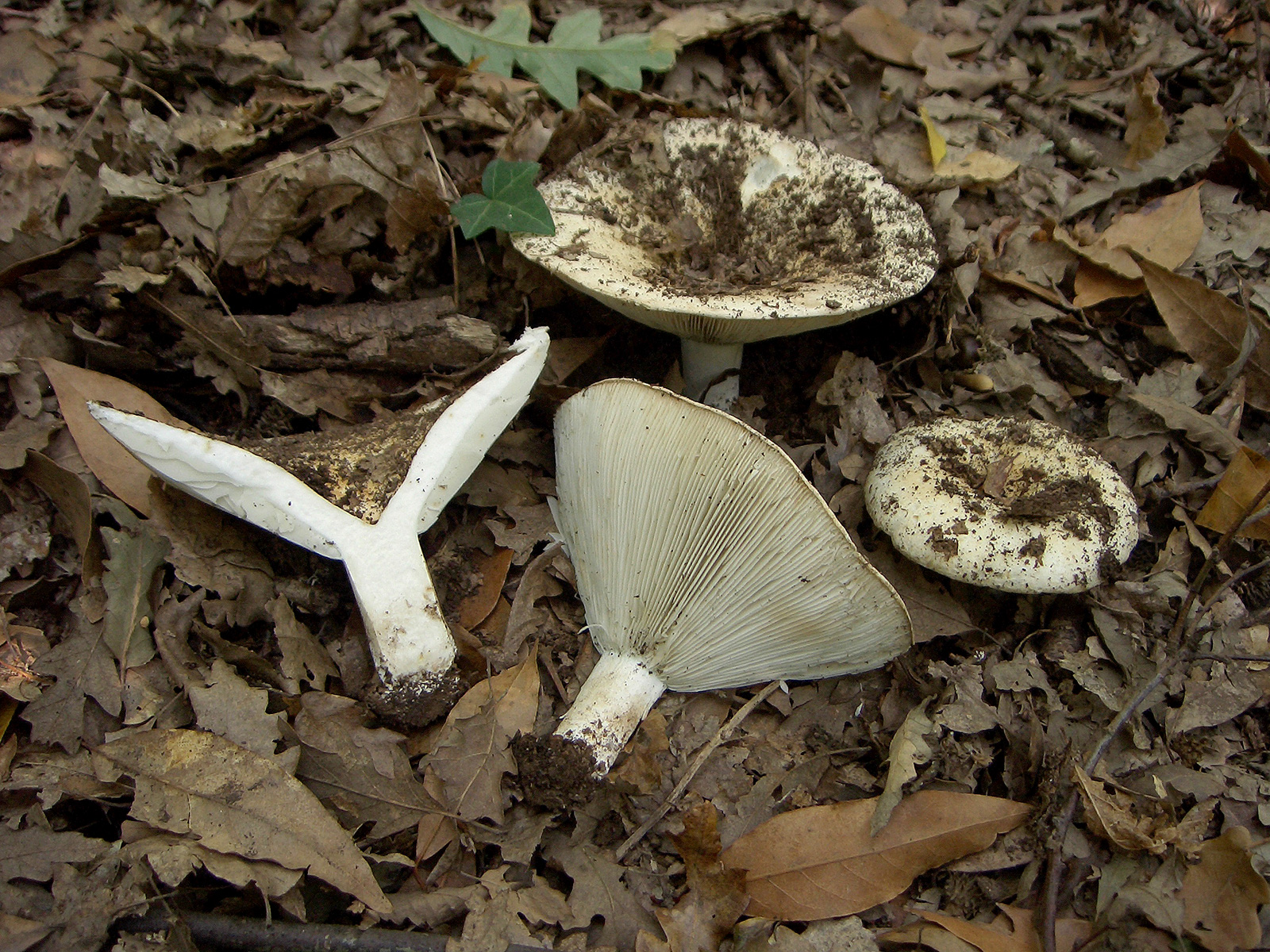
R. chloroides

- Russula cyanoxantha – high quality edible with blue to greenish cap, mild taste and white, greasy gills.
- Russula emetica
- Russula subnigricans – a poisonous mushroom causing rhabdomyolysis in Japan, China, and Taiwan.
- Russula virescens – an excellent edible, recognizable by the green and distinctly crackled cap cuticle;
- Russula xerampelina – an edible russula that smells and tastes like shrimp or seafood.

== See also ==
- Mushroom hunting
- Mushroom poisoning

== Cited literature ==
- Dugan FM. (2011). Conspectus of World Ethnomycology. St. Paul, Minnesota: American Phytopathological Society. ISBN 978-0-89054-395-5.
- Arora, D. (1986). Mushrooms demystified: A comprehensive guide to the fleshy fungi, Berkeley: Ten Speed Press. pp. 83–103.
- Kibby, G. & Fatto, R. (1990). Keys to the species of Russula in northeastern North America, Somerville, NJ: Kibby-Fatto Enterprises. 70 pp.
- Weber, N. S. & Smith, A. H. (1985). A field guide to southern mushrooms, Ann Arbor: U Michigan P. 280 pp.
- Moser, M. (1978) Basidiomycetes II: Röhrlinge und Blätterpilze, Gustav Fischer Verlag Stuttgart. English edition: Keys to Agarics and Boleti... published by Roger Phillips, London.
- Partly translated from Dutch page.
