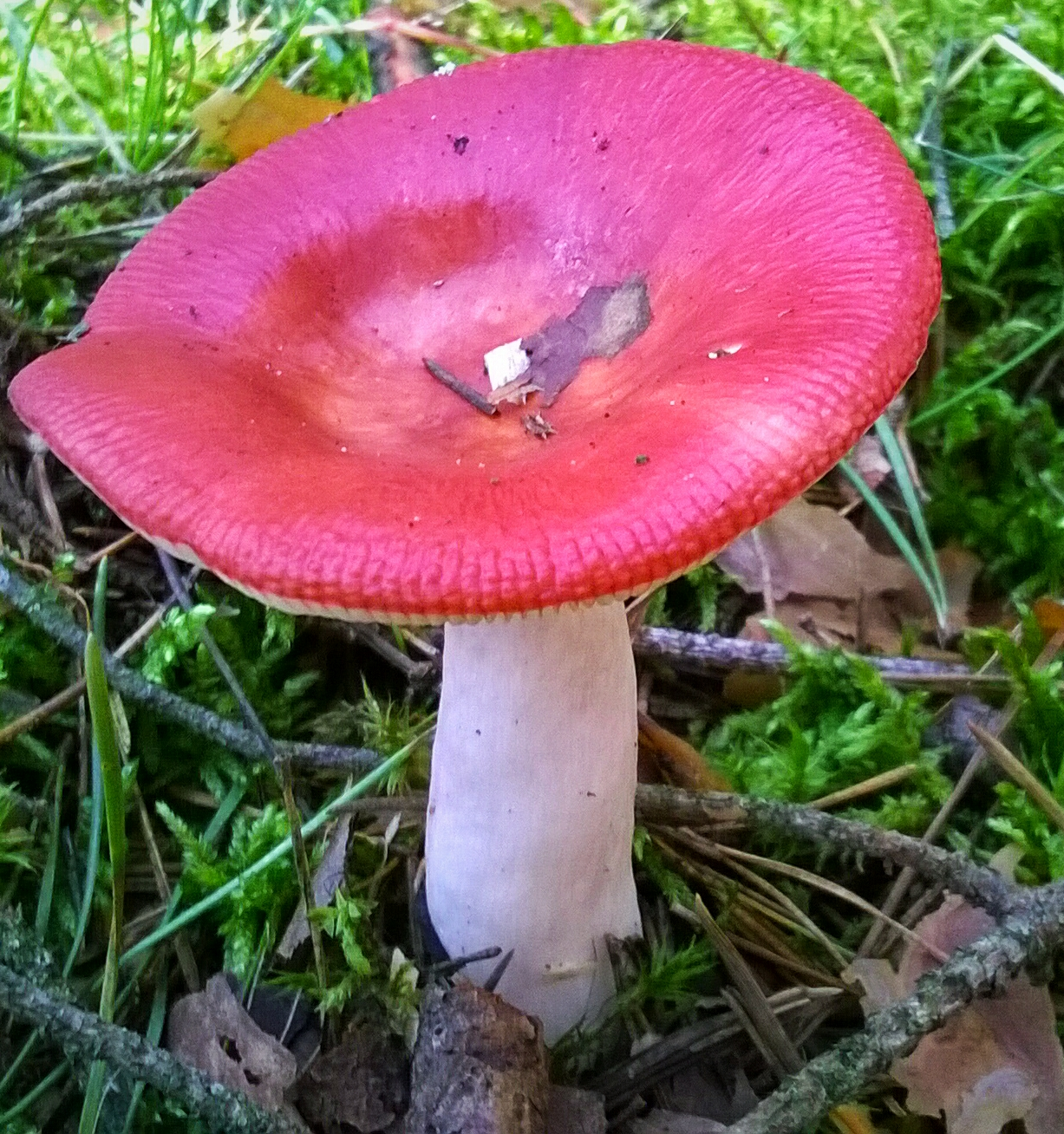

Scientific classification
- Kingdom: Fungi
- Division: Basidiomycota
- Class: Agaricomycetes
- Order: Russulales
- Family: Russulaceae
- Genus: Russula
- Species: R. emetica

Binomial name
- Russula emetica (Schaeff.) Pers. (1796)

Synonyms
- Agaricus russula Scop. (1772); Agaricus emeticus Schaeff. (1774); Amanita rubra Lam. (1783); Agaricus ruber (Lam.) DC. (1805); Agaricus linnaei var. emeticus (Schaeff.) Fr. (1815); Russula rubra (Lam.) Fr. (1838); Melanoleuca russula (Scop.) Murrill (1914)

= Russula emetica =

Species of mushroom

Russula emetica
- Mycological characteristics
- Gills on hymenium
- Cap is convex or flat
- Hymenium is adnate or free
- Stipe is bare
- Spore print is white
- Ecology is mycorrhizal
- Edibility is poisonous

Russula emetica, commonly known as the sickener, emetic russula, or vomiting russula, is a basidiomycete mushroom, and the type species of the genus Russula. It was first described in 1774.

It has a red, convex to flat cap up to 8.5 cm (3.3 in) in diameter, with a cuticle that can be peeled off almost to the centre. The gills are white to pale cream, and closely spaced. A smooth white stem measures up to 10.5 cm (4.1 in) long and 2.4 cm (0.9 in) thick. There are many similar russulas with a red cap and white stem and gills, some of which can be reliably distinguished only by microscopy. The mushroom has a wide distribution in the Northern Hemisphere, where it grows on the ground in damp woodlands in a mycorrhizal association with conifers, especially pine.

The mushroom's common names refer to the gastrointestinal distress which it causes when consumed raw. The flesh is extremely peppery, but this offensive taste, along with its toxicity, can be removed by parboiling or pickling. Although it used to be widely eaten in Russia and eastern European countries, it is generally not recommended for consumption.

== Taxonomy ==
Russula emetica was first officially described as Agaricus emeticus by Jacob Christian Schaeffer in 1774, in his series on fungi of Bavaria and the Palatinate, Fungorum qui in Bavaria et Palatinatu circa Ratisbonam nascuntur icones. Christian Hendrik Persoon placed it in its current genus Russula in 1796, where it remains. According to the nomenclatural database MycoBank, Agaricus russula is a synonym of R. emetica that was published by Giovanni Antonio Scopoli in 1772, two years earlier than Schaeffer's description. However, this name is unavailable as Persoon's name is sanctioned. Additional synonyms include Jean-Baptiste Lamarck's Amanita rubra (1783), and Augustin Pyramus de Candolle's subsequent new combination Agaricus ruber (1805). The specific epithet is derived from the Ancient Greek emetikos/εμετικος 'emetic' or 'vomit-inducing'. Similarly, its common names of sickener, emetic russula, and vomiting russula also refer to this attribute.

Russula emetica is the type species of the genus Russula. According to Rolf Singer's infrageneric classification of Russula, it is also the type of the section Russula. In an alternative classification proposed by Henri Romagnesi, it is the type species of subsection Emeticinae. A molecular analysis of European Russula species determined that R. emetica groups in a clade with R. raoultii, R. betularum, and R. nana; a later analysis confirmed the close phylogenetic relationship between R. emetica and the latter two Russulas.

== Description ==
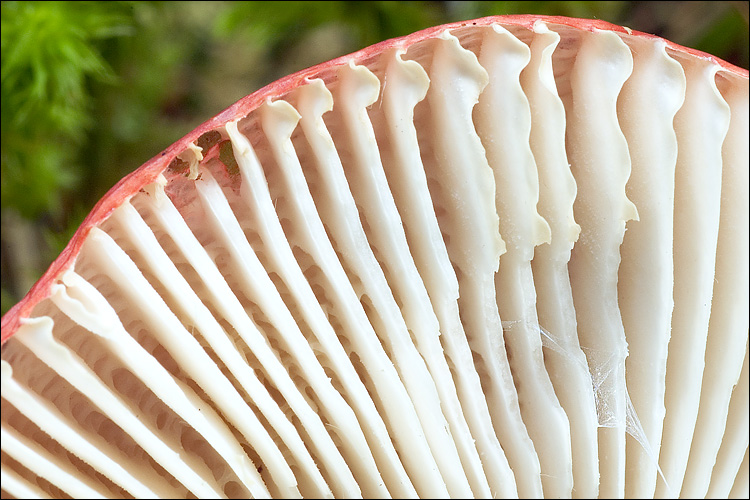
The closely spaced gills are intervenose, and occasionally forked.

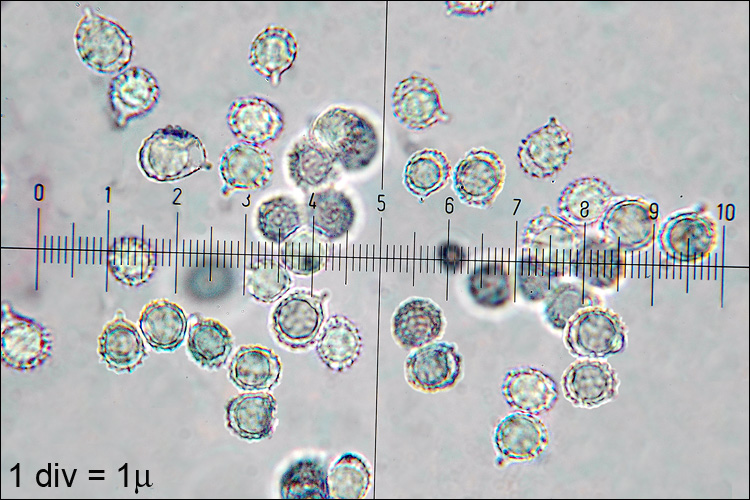
The spores are elliptical to egg-shaped and ornamented with warts and spines.

The sticky cap of R. emetica is 2.5–10 cm (1–4 in) wide, with a shape ranging from convex (in young specimens) to flattened, sometimes with a central depression, and sometimes with a shallow umbo. It is a bright scarlet or cherry red, and in maturity, the margins have fine radial grooves extending 2–7 mm (0.08–0.3 in) towards the center of the cap. The cuticle can be readily peeled from the cap almost to the centre. The brittle flesh is white (or tinged with red directly under the cap cuticle), measures 4–9 mm (0.2–0.4 in) thick, and has a very sharp and peppery taste. The gills are closely spaced, white to creamy-white, and adnate to adnexed or completely free. They are intervenose (containing cross-veins in the spaces between the gills) and occasionally forked near the cap margin.

The white stem measures 4.5–10.5 cm (1.8–4.1 in) long by 0.7–2.4 cm (0.3–0.9 in) thick, and is roughly the same width throughout its length, although it can be a bit thicker near the base. Its surface is dry and smooth, sometimes marked by faint longitudinal grooves. It is either stuffed (filled with a cottony pith) or partially hollow, and lacks a ring or partial veil. The fruit bodies have a slightly fruity or spicy smell.

Russula emetica produces a white to yellowish-white spore print. The spores are roughly elliptical to egg-shaped, with a strongly warted and partially reticulate (web-like) surface. They have dimensions of 8.8–11.0 by 6.6–8 μm, and are amyloid, meaning that they will stain blue, bluish-grey, to blackish in Melzer's reagent. Basidia (spore-bearing cells) are club-shaped, four-spored, hyaline (translucent), and measure 32.9–50 by 9.0–11.6 μm. Cystidia located on the gill face (pleurocystidia) are somewhat cylindrical to club-shaped or somewhat spindle-shaped, and measure 35–88 by 7.3–12.4 μm. They are yellowish, and contain granular contents. Cheilocystidia (found on the edges of the gills), which are similar in shape to the pleurocystidia, are thin-walled, hyaline, and measure 14–24 by 4.4–7.3 μm. Clamp connections are absent from the hyphae.

The red pigments of this and other russulas are water-soluble to some degree, and fruit bodies will often bleach or fade with rain or sunlight; the cap colour of older specimens may fade to pink or orange, or develop white blotches. The main pigment responsible for the red colour of the fruit bodies is called russularhodin, but little is known of its chemical composition.

=== Similar species ===
Russula emetica is one of over 100 red-capped Russula species known worldwide. The related beechwood sickener (R. nobilis) is found under beech in Europe. Many, such as the bloody brittlegill (R. sanguinaria), are inedible; this species can be distinguished from R. emetica by the reddish flush in its stem. Among the edible lookalikes, there is R. paludosa, commonly found in Europe and North America. R. aurea has a yellow stem, gills and flesh under its red cap. The edible R. rugulosa—common in mixed woods in the eastern and northern United States—has a wrinkled and pimpled cap cuticle, cream spores, and mild taste. Another inedible species, R. fragilis, has notched gills, and its stem stains blue with naphthol. The uncommon European subspecies R. emetica longipes is distinguished by its longer stem and ochre gills. The paler European mushroom R. betularum, found in coniferous forests and moorland, is sometimes considered a subspecies of R. emetica. R. nana is restricted in distribution to arctic and subarctic highland meadows where dwarf willow (Salix herbacea) or alpine bearberry (Arctostaphylos alpina) are abundant.

Red-capped Russula lookalikes
R. paludosa often has a less pronounced cap color	R. sanguinaria has a reddish flush in its stem.	R. nobilis grows in association with beech.	R. aurea has a yellow stem, gills, and flesh.	R. nana grows in highlands with dwarf willow or alpine bearberry.

== Distribution and habitat ==
Like all species of Russula, R. emetica is mycorrhizal, and forms mutually beneficial partnerships with roots of trees and certain herbaceous plants. Preferred host plants are conifers, especially pines. Fruit bodies grow singly, scattered, or in groups in sphagnum moss near bogs, and in coniferous and mixed forests. The fungus occasionally fruits on humus or on very rotten wood. The mushroom is known from North Africa, Asia and Europe and can be locally very common. There is some doubt over the extent of its range in North America, as some sightings refer to the related R. silvicola; initially the name "Russula emetica" was often applied to any red-capped white Russula. Sightings in Australia are now referred to the similarly coloured R. persanguinea.

A multi-year field study of the growth of R. emetica production in a scots pine plantation in Scotland found that total productivity was 0.24–0.49 million mushrooms per hectare per year (roughly 0.1–0.2 million mushrooms/acre/year), corresponding to a fresh weight of 265–460 kg per hectare per year (49–85 lb/acre/year). Productivity was highest from August to October. The longevity of the mushrooms was estimated to be 4–7 days. In a study of the fungal diversity of ectomycorrhizal species in a Sitka spruce forest, R. emetica was one of the top five dominant fungi. Comparing the frequency of fruit body production between 10-, 20-, 30-, or 40-year-old forest stands, R. emetica was most prolific in the latter. It fruits from late summer until early winter.

== Ecology ==
Both the red squirrel (Sciurus vulgaris) and the American red squirrel (Tamiasciurus hudsonicus) are known to forage for, store and eat R. emetica; adapted to a terpene-rich food such as pine nuts, squirrels would not be put off by the abundant sesquiterpenes in this mushroom, which render it unpalatable and slightly poisonous to humans.

Invertebrates that have been documented consuming this mushroom include gastropods such as the snail Mesodon thyroidus and several species of slugs (including Arion ater, A. subfuscus, A. intermedius, Limax maximus, L. cinereoniger, and Deroceras reticulatum). Diptera found feeding on R.emetica include the fruit flies Drosophila falleni and D. quinaria, and the fungus gnat Allodia bipexa. Adults of the pleasing fungus beetle Tritoma angulata have been recorded from this fungus, but it does not seem to be a regular food source for them. However, references to "R.emetica" in older studies may actually refer to relatives that are now considered distinct species.

== Toxicity ==
As its name implies, the sickener is inedible, though not as dangerous as sometimes described in older mushroom guides. The symptoms are mainly gastrointestinal in nature: nausea, diarrhoea, vomiting, and colicky abdominal cramps. These symptoms typically begin half an hour to three hours after ingestion of the mushroom, and usually subside spontaneously, or shortly after the ingested material has been expelled from the intestinal tract. The active agents have not been identified but are thought to be sesquiterpenes, which have been isolated from the related genus Lactarius and from Russula sardonia. Sesquiterpenoids that have been identified from R. emetica include the previously known compounds lactarorufin A, furandiol, methoxyfuranalcohol, and an unnamed compound unique to this species.

== Uses ==
The bitter taste disappears on cooking and it is said to then be edible, though consumption is not recommended. The mushroom used to be widely eaten in eastern European countries and Russia after parboiling (which removes the toxins), and then salting or pickling. In some regions of Hungary and Slovakia, the cap cuticle is removed and used as a spice for goulash.

== See also ==
- List of Russula species
