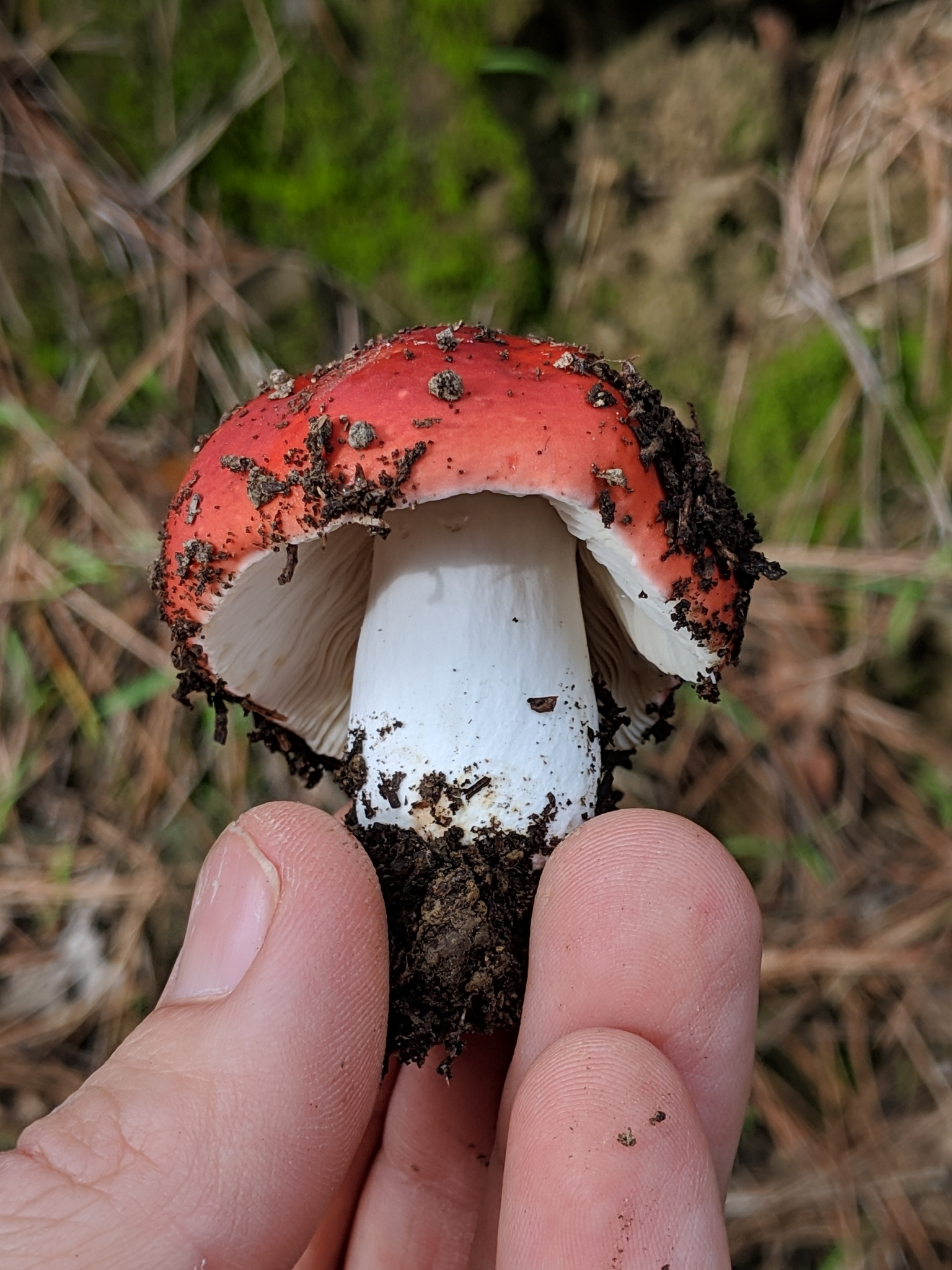
- Oakland, California (2019)

Scientific classification
- Kingdom: Fungi
- Division: Basidiomycota
- Class: Agaricomycetes
- Order: Russulales
- Family: Russulaceae
- Genus: Russula
- Species: R. californiensis

Binomial name
- Russula californiensis Burl. (1936)

= Russula californiensis =

Species of fungus

Russula californiensis
- Mycological characteristics
- Gills on hymenium
- Cap is convex or depressed
- Hymenium is adnate or adnexed
- Stipe is bare
- Spore print is yellow
- Edibility is unknown

Russula californiensis is a species of gilled mushroom. It is endemic to California in North America. First described by Gertrude Simmons Burlingham in 1936, R. californiensis is usually found in fall and winter in association with Monterey pine and bishop pine. The cap is semi-viscid when wet, and coral to brown in color, with creamy splotches possibly developing as it ages. The stipe stains gray or black. Similar-looking mushrooms with potential geographical overlap include Russula sanguinaria and Russula queletii.

== See also ==
- Russula cremoricolor
- List of Russula species
