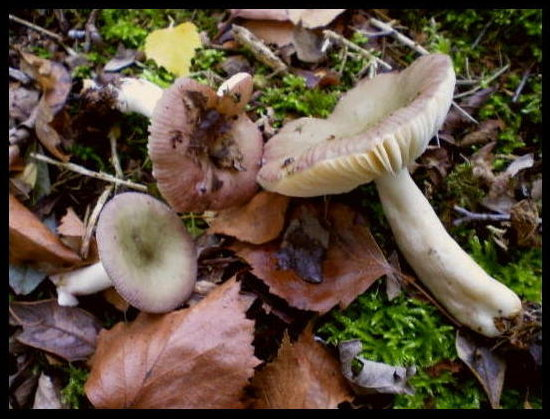

Scientific classification
- Domain: Eukaryota
- Kingdom: Fungi
- Division: Basidiomycota
- Class: Agaricomycetes
- Order: Russulales
- Family: Russulaceae
- Genus: Russula
- Species: R. gracillima

Binomial name
- Russula gracillima Jul.Schäff. (1931)

= Russula gracillima =

Species of fungus

Russula gracillima Mycological characteristics
- Gills on hymenium
- Cap is convex or flat
- Hymenium is decurrent
- Stipe is bare
- Spore print is cream
- Edibility is unknown

The mushroom Russula gracillima, commonly known as the slender brittlegill, is a member of the genus Russula, whose members are commonly known as brittlegills. It is a small, pale, long stemmed brittlegill associated mainly with birch and is occasional in Europe, Asia, and North America.

== Taxonomy ==
It was first described by the German mycologist Jacob Christian Schaeffer during the 18th century. The specific epithet comes from the Latin adjective gracilis, meaning thin, or slender.

== Description ==
The cap is 2–6 cm in diameter. Usually it is dull greenish or olive at the centre, and with a pink margin, although it can be solely either of these colours, or sometimes pale violet. At first, it is convex, but later flattens, and sometimes has a small central boss (umbo). The cap skin peels from one third to a half, and more mature specimens often have a furrowed margin. The fragile, white or pale greyish-rose stipe is long for the size of the cap. The gills are slightly decurrent, and pale cream giving a spore print of the same colour. They have no nicks, or notches on their free edges. The flesh is white and tastes moderately hot.

Similar species are Russula betularum which is frequently found near birch trees, and although usually paler can be mistaken for washed out specimens of R. racillima. Also, Russula fragilis is very similar, and grows in the same locations. It is usually darker, and more purplish, and has nicks (serrations) on the gill edges which are distinctive under a hand lens.

== Distribution and habitat ==
Russula gracillima appears occasionally in summer to late autumn, usually growing in small groups with birch, or sometimes willow in damp places. It is widespread in the northern temperate zones in Europe, Asia, and North America.

== Edibility ==
The edibility of Russula gracilis is unknown.

== See also ==
- List of Russula species
