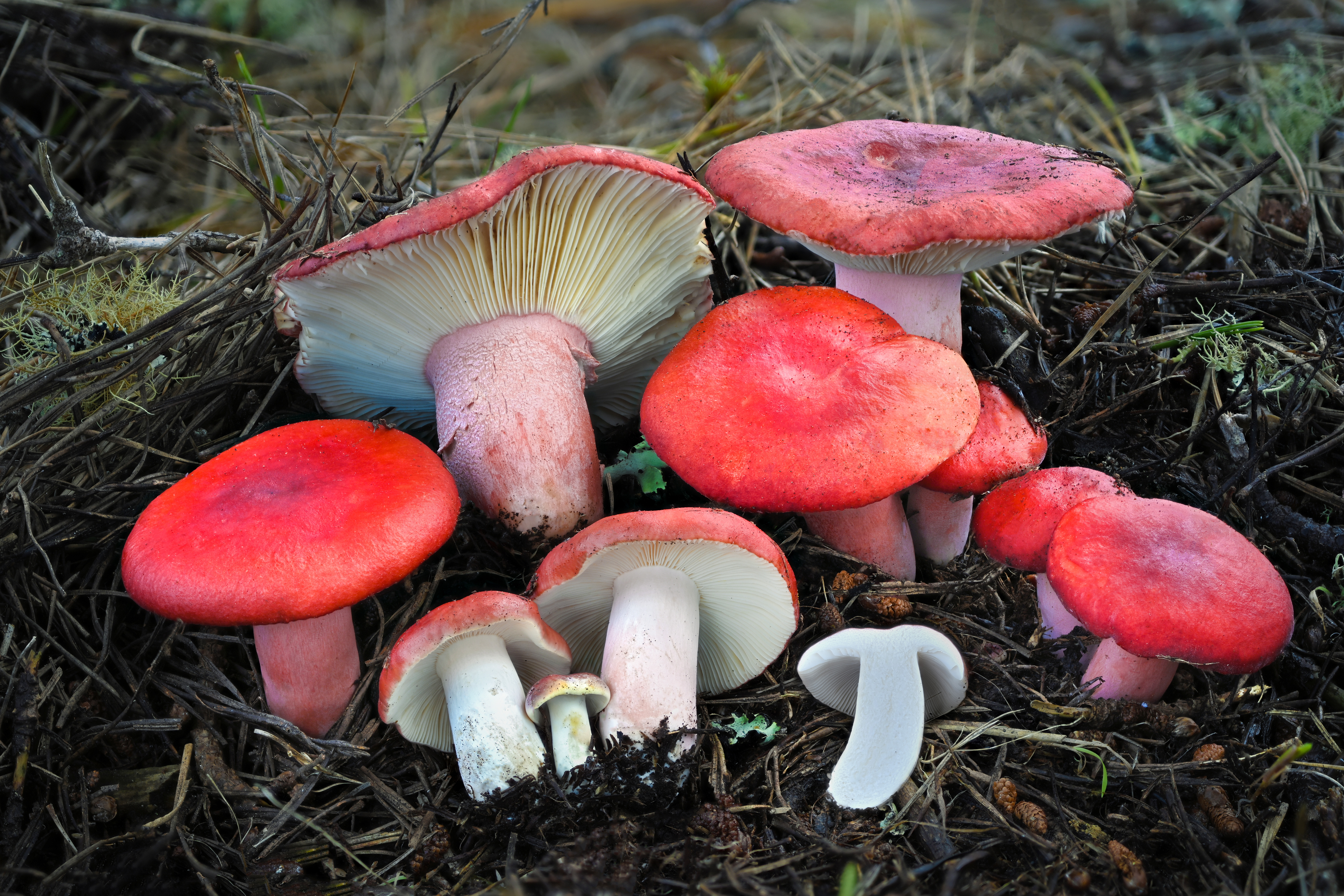
- Pacifica, California, 2021

Scientific classification
- Kingdom: Fungi
- Division: Basidiomycota
- Class: Agaricomycetes
- Order: Russulales
- Family: Russulaceae
- Genus: Russula
- Species: R. rhodocephala

Binomial name
- Russula rhodocephala Bazzic., D.Miller & Buyck (2017)

= Russula rhodocephala =

Fungus species

Russula rhodocephala
- Mycological characteristics
- Gills on hymenium
- Cap is convex or depressed
- Hymenium is adnate
- Stipe is bare
- Spore print is cream to yellow
- Edibility is not recommended

Russula rhodocephala, also known as the redhead brittlegill, rosy russula, or redhead russula, is a species of gilled mushroom. It typically grows in association with pine trees. It is primarily found on the Pacific coast of western North America, although mushrooms with 97 percent genetic similarity are known from Asia. This species was formerly considered to be Russula sanguinaria, from which it has been recently separated due to differences in genetics and geographic distribution. It has an extremely acrid taste when raw, and is described as having a "disgusting" flavor when cooked. Another source describes it as having unknown edibility.

== Description ==
The cap of Russula rhodocephala is red in color and about 4-12 centimeters in diameter. It starts out round or convex and becomes broadly convex or flat as the mushroom gets older. The gills can be white or yellowish and can be adnexed or adnate. The stipe is pink in color and about 2.5-7 centimeters long and 1-2.5 centimeters wide. The spore print is pale yellow or cream-colored.

== See also ==
- List of Russula species
