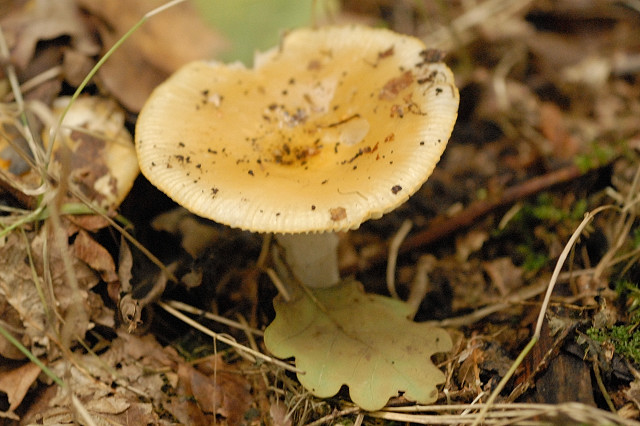
- Russula raoultii from Commanster, Belgium.

Scientific classification
- Kingdom: Fungi
- Division: Basidiomycota
- Class: Agaricomycetes
- Order: Russulales
- Family: Russulaceae
- Genus: Russula
- Species: R. raoultii

Binomial name
- Russula raoultii Quél. (1886)

Synonyms
- Russula emetica f. raoultii (Quél.) Singer (1932); Russula ochroleuca var. raoultii (Quél.) Quél. (1888); Russula truncigena Britzelm. (1893); Russula fragilis var. raoultii (Quél.) Jul.Schäff (1940)

= Russula raoultii =

Species of fungus

Russula raoultii is an inedible species of agaric fungus in the family Russulaceae. It was first described by French mycologist Lucien Quélet in 1886.

The cap is 3 to 8 cm wide, white to yellow, and becoming more convex in age. The stalk is 3 to 8 cm long and 1 to 2 cm wide. The spores are white, subglobose, with reticular warts. It has an acrid taste.

Similar species include Russula crassotunicata, R. cremoricolor, and R. stuntzii.

== See also ==
- List of Russula species
