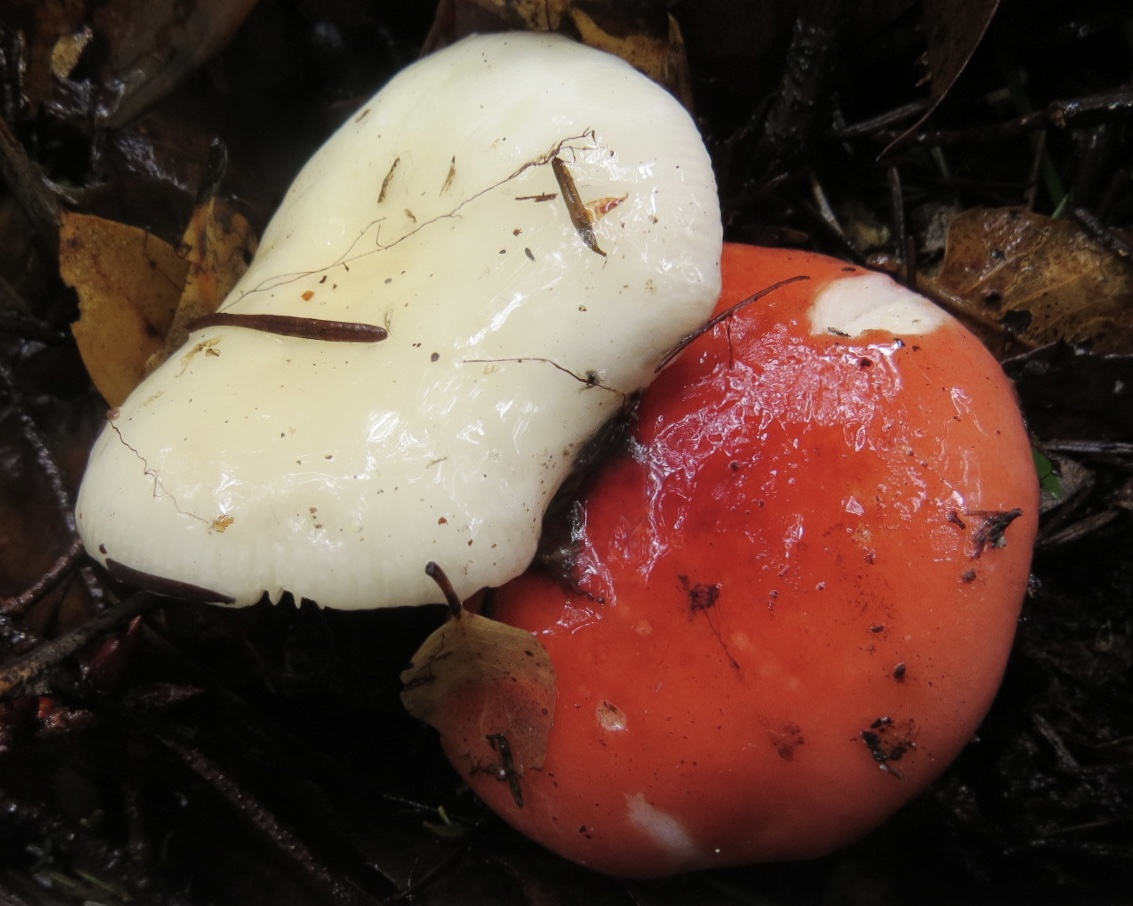
- Russula cremoricolor, San Mateo County, California, 2019
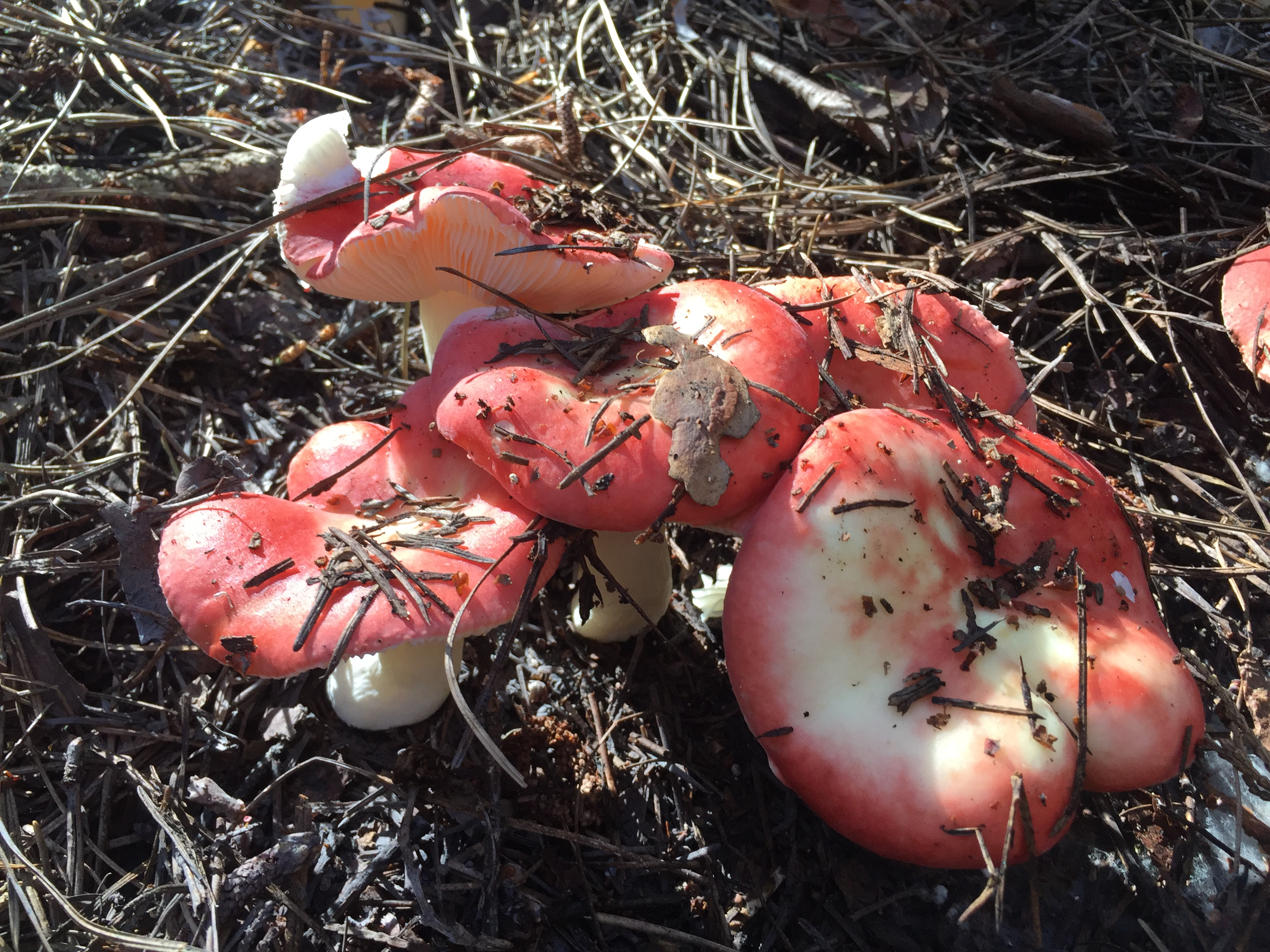
- Pink morph, Shasta National Forest, 2018

Scientific classification
- Kingdom: Fungi
- Division: Basidiomycota
- Class: Agaricomycetes
- Order: Russulales
- Family: Russulaceae
- Genus: Russula
- Species: R. cremoricolor

Binomial name
- Russula cremoricolor Earle (1902)

= Russula cremoricolor =

Species of fungus

Russula cremoricolor Mycological characteristics
- Gills on hymenium
- Cap is convex or depressed
- Hymenium is adnexed or adnate
- Stipe is bare
- Spore print is white
- Edibility is poisonous

Russula cremoricolor, also known as the winter russula, is a species of gilled mushroom. It is mildly toxic.

== Taxonomy ==
The red variant was previously identified as Russula silvicola, but was found to be genetically identical to the cream-colored R. cremoricolor.

== Description ==
This mushroom has red, cream-yellow, and pink color variants, which complicates attempts at field identification.

=== Similar species ===
R. californiensis is similar, but R. cremoricolor keeps its gills and stipe white even in age, has a sharper taste, and associates with mixed forest or tanoak rather than pine.

== Habitat ==
The species can be found growing in groups.

== Toxicity ==
The species is mildly toxic, causing intestinal distress even when consumed in small amounts. Its acrid taste is also a deterrent.

== See also ==
- List of Russula species
- Russula emetica
