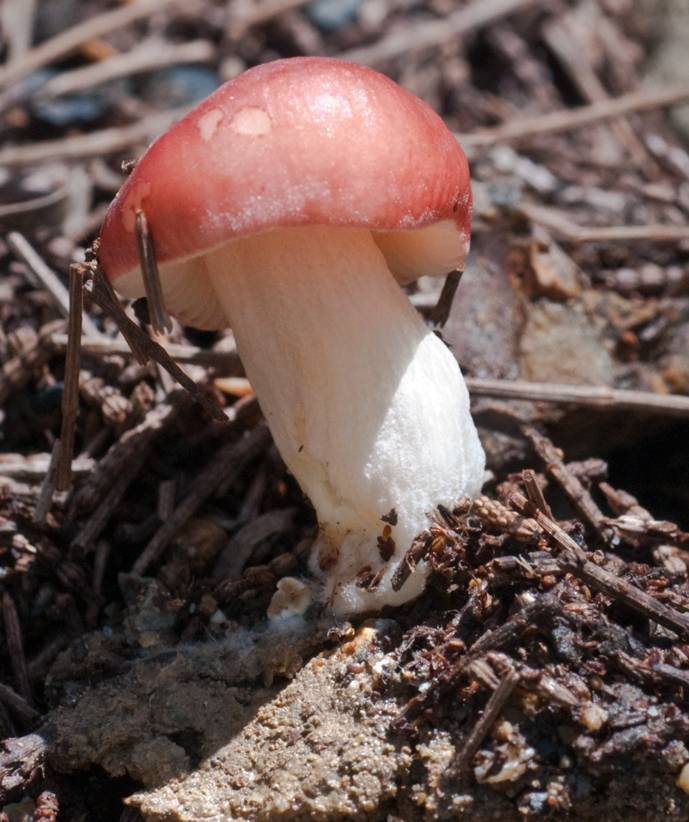

Scientific classification
- Domain: Eukaryota
- Kingdom: Fungi
- Division: Basidiomycota
- Class: Agaricomycetes
- Order: Russulales
- Family: Russulaceae
- Genus: Russula
- Species: R. persanguinea

Binomial name
- Russula persanguinea Cleland (1933)

= Russula persanguinea =

Species of fungus

Russula persanguinea is a species of agaric fungus in the family Russulaceae. Described as new to science by John Burton Cleland in 1933, it is found in Australia, where it grows singly or in small groups on the ground in eucalypt forests and woodlands. It resembles the common Northern Hemisphere species Russula emetica.

== See also ==
- List of Russula species
