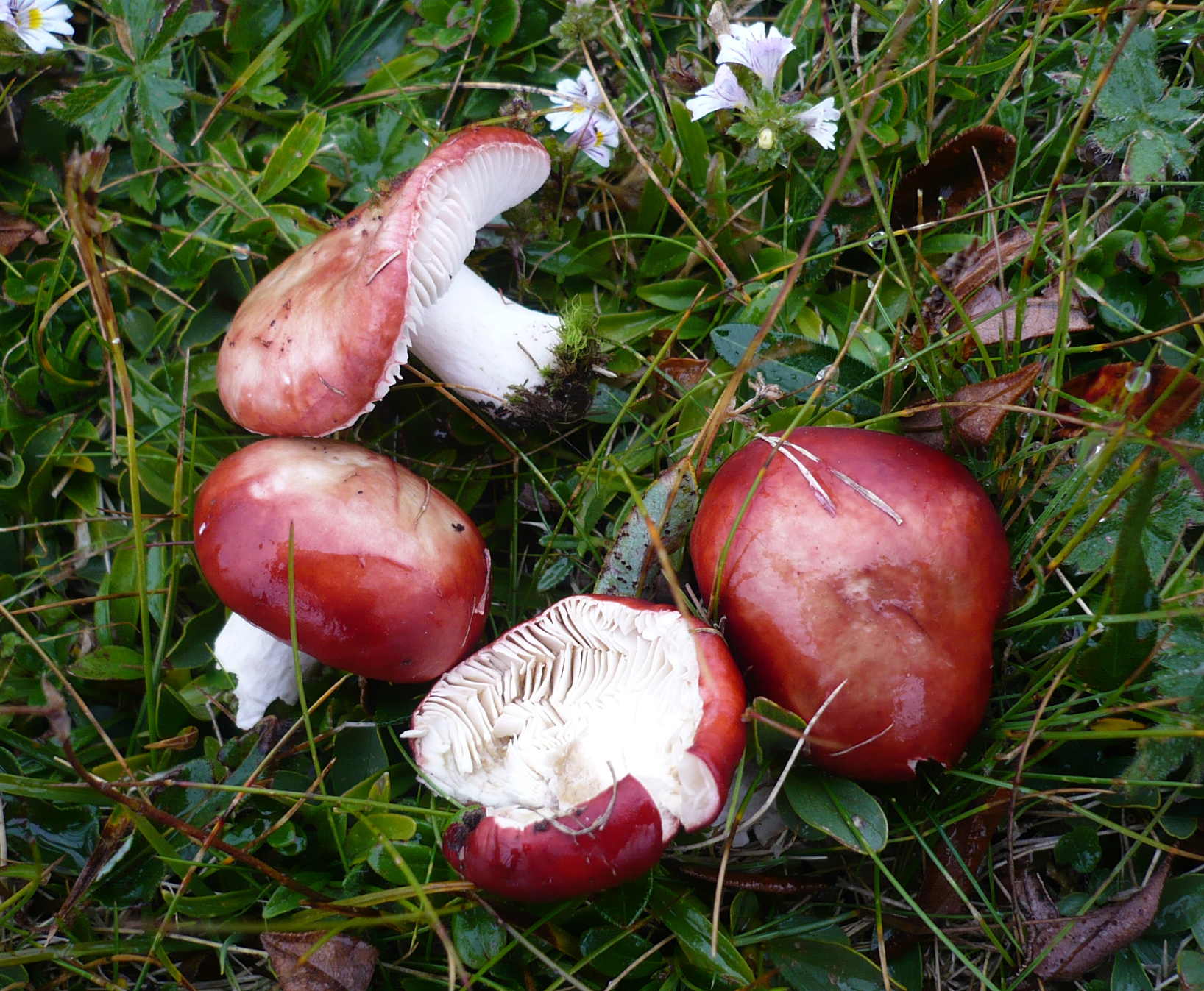

Scientific classification
- Kingdom: Fungi
- Division: Basidiomycota
- Class: Agaricomycetes
- Order: Russulales
- Family: Russulaceae
- Genus: Russula
- Species: R. nana

Binomial name
- Russula nana Killerm. (1936)

Synonyms
- Russula emetica var. alpina A.Blytt & Rostr. (1905)

= Russula nana =

Species of fungus

Russula nana is a species of agaric fungus in the family Russulaceae. First described in 1905 as variety of Russula emetica, it was given distinct species status by Killermann in 1936. It is found in Europe.

== See also ==
- List of Russula species
