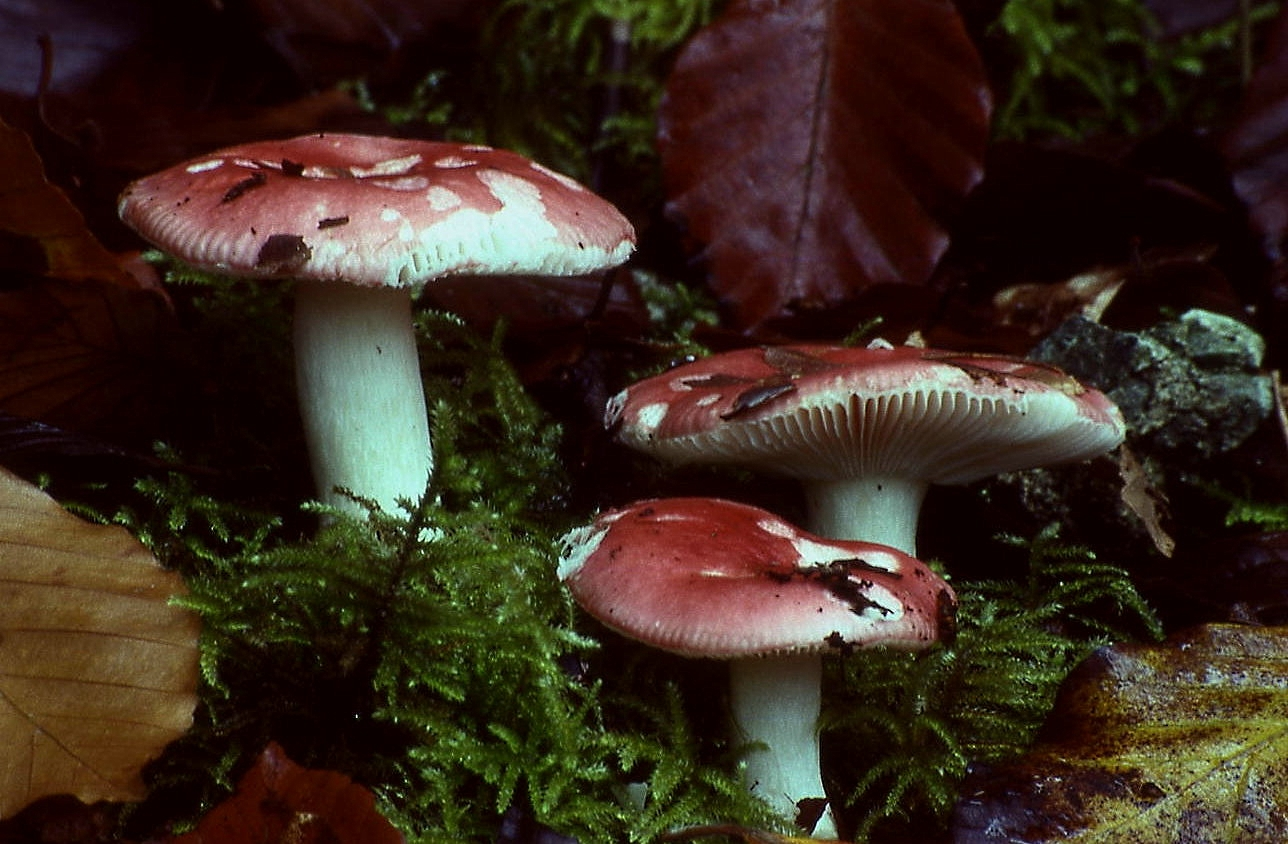

Scientific classification
- Domain: Eukaryota
- Kingdom: Fungi
- Division: Basidiomycota
- Class: Agaricomycetes
- Order: Russulales
- Family: Russulaceae
- Genus: Russula
- Species: R. nobilis

Binomial name
- Russula nobilis Velen.

Synonyms
- Russula mairei Singer

= Russula nobilis =

Basidiomycete mushroom of the genus Russula

Russula nobilis Mycological characteristics
- Gills on hymenium
- Cap is convex
- Hymenium is free
- Stipe is bare
- Spore print is white
- Ecology is mycorrhizal
- Edibility is inedible

Formerly Russula mairei (Singer), and commonly known as the beechwood sickener, the now re-classified fungus Russula nobilis (Velen.) is a basidiomycete mushroom of the genus Russula. This group of mushrooms are noted for their brittle gills and bright colours.

== Taxonomy ==
It was previously named in honour of French mycologist René Maire by Rolf Singer in 1929, but found to be the same taxon as the earlier 1920 Russula nobilis, which has naming priority.

== Description ==
The cap is a red or rosy colour, 3–6 cm wide, convex to flat, or slightly depressed, and weakly sticky. It peels only to a third of its radius, which reveals pink flesh. The flesh is firm and white or sometimes yellowish, smells of coconut, and tastes peppery. It is often damaged by slugs. The stem is 2–5 cm long, 1–1.5 cm wide, cylindrical, (firmer than its conifer dwelling namesake, Russula emetica), and white. The gills are narrowly spaced, adnexed, rounded, and white, often with a faint blue-green sheen. The spore print is white.

== Distribution and habitat ==
The species is mycorrhizal with beech (Fagus) in woodland areas. It is widespread and common in Europe, Asia, and North America, where these trees grow.

== Edibility ==
Russula nobilis is inedible, and probably poisonous in quantity, but not deadly. Many bitter tasting red-capped species can cause problems if eaten raw; the symptoms are mainly gastrointestinal in nature: diarrhoea, vomiting and colicky abdominal cramps. The active agent has not been identified but thought to be caused by chemical compounds known as sesquiterpenes, which have been isolated from the related genus Lactarius and from Russula sardonia.

== See also ==
- List of Russula species
