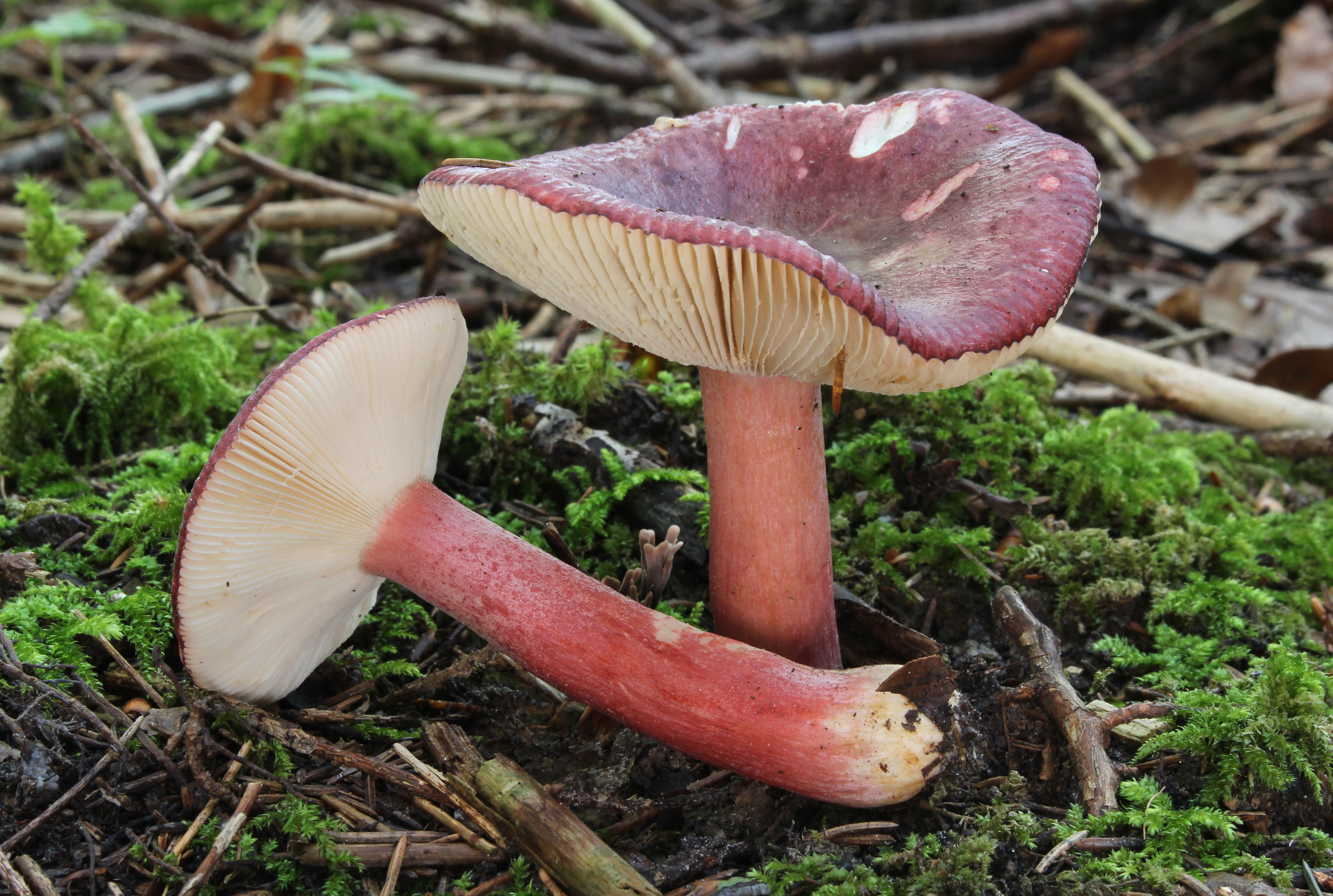

Scientific classification
- Kingdom: Fungi
- Division: Basidiomycota
- Class: Agaricomycetes
- Order: Russulales
- Family: Russulaceae
- Genus: Russula
- Species: R. queletii

Binomial name
- Russula queletii Fr. 1872

= Russula queletii =

Species of fungus

Russula queletii otherwise known as the gooseberry russula, is a common, inedible, Russula mushroom found growing in groups, predominantly in spruce forest. Eating this mushroom causes abdominal pains.

== Description ==
The cap is round or convex when young, later becoming broadly convex, flat, or depressed. It is wine-red to purplish in colour and is about 3-10 centimeters in diameter. The gills are white to cream-colored and adnate, subdecurrent, or adnexed. The spore print is cream-colored. The stipe is a similar color to the cap and is about 3-8 centimeters long and 0.5-1.8 centimeters wide. The flesh is white. The scent is fruity, but the taste is acrid.

=== Similar species ===
- Russula sardonia
- Russula torulosa

== See also ==
Russula queletii
- Mycological characteristics
- Gills on hymenium
- Cap is convex or depressed
- Hymenium is adnexed or adnate
- Stipe is bare
- Spore print is cream
- Ecology is mycorrhizal
- Edibility is not recommended or unknown

- List of Russula species
