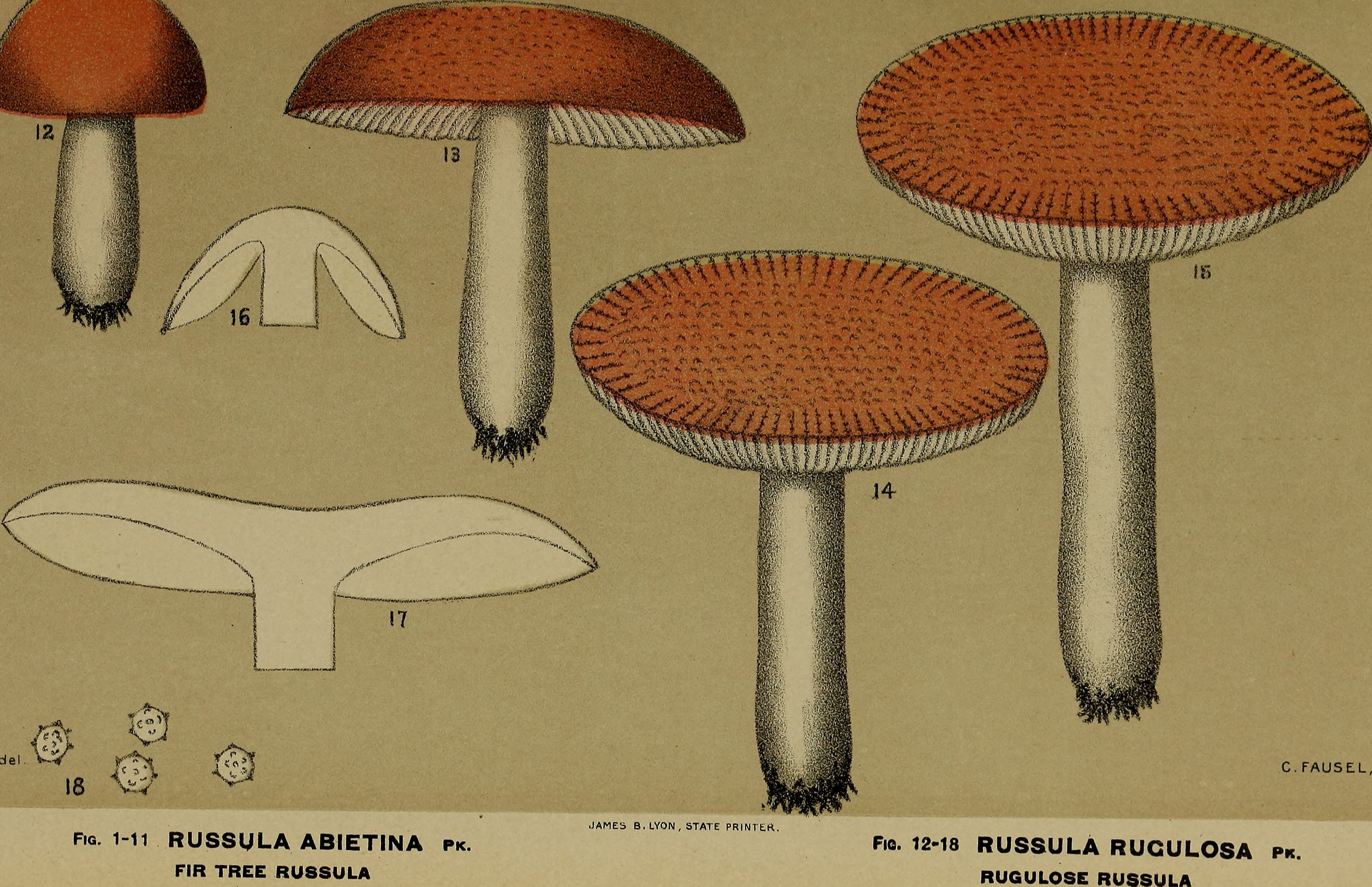

Scientific classification
- Domain: Eukaryota
- Kingdom: Fungi
- Division: Basidiomycota
- Class: Agaricomycetes
- Order: Russulales
- Family: Russulaceae
- Genus: Russula
- Species: R. rugulosa

Binomial name
- Russula rugulosa Peck (1902)

= Russula rugulosa =

Species of fungus

Russula rugulosa is a species of agaric fungus in the family Russulaceae. It was first described by American mycologist Charles Horton Peck in 1902.

== See also ==
- List of Russula species
