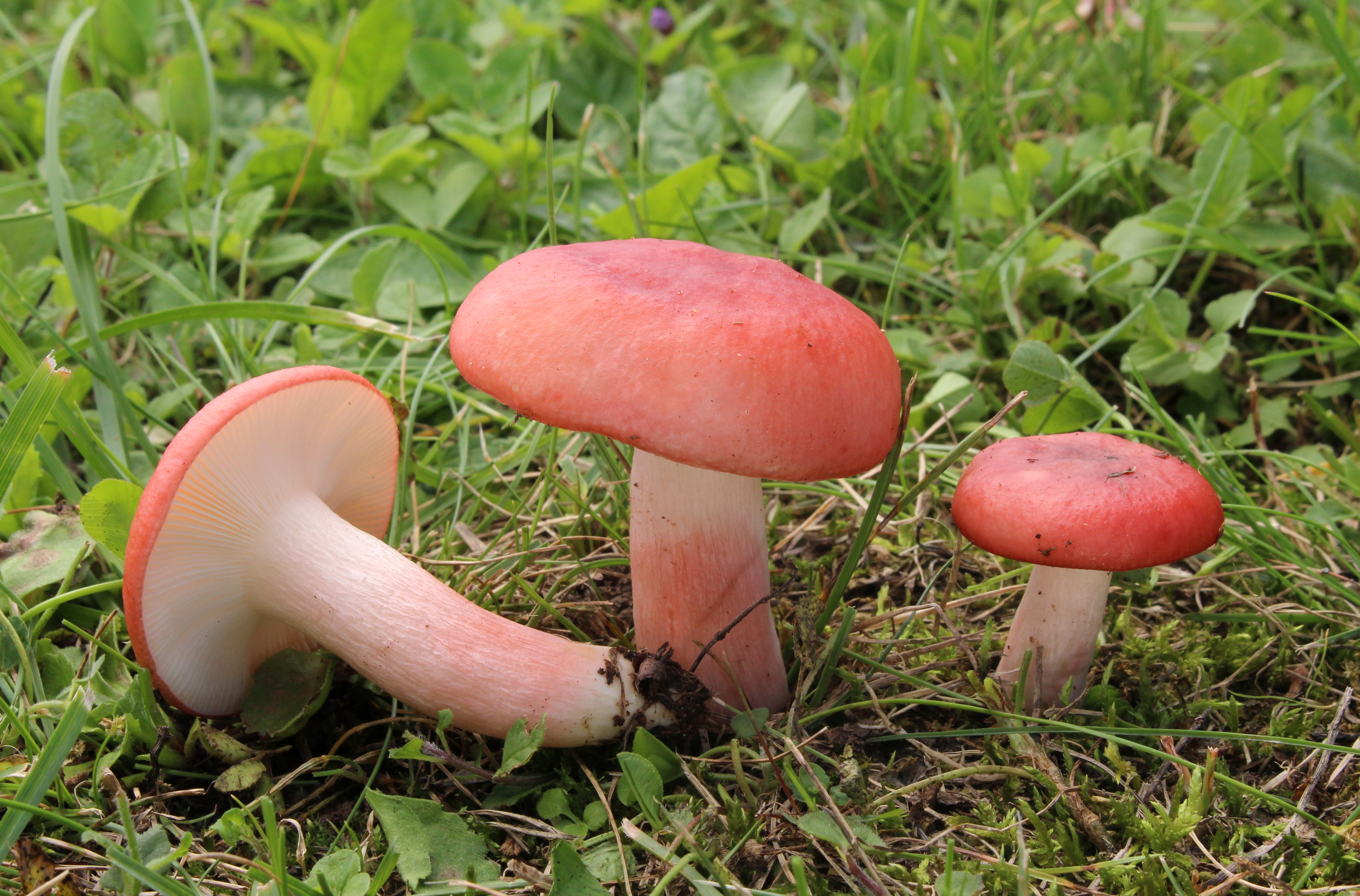

Scientific classification
- Kingdom: Fungi
- Division: Basidiomycota
- Class: Agaricomycetes
- Order: Russulales
- Family: Russulaceae
- Genus: Russula
- Species: R. sanguinaria

Binomial name
- Russula sanguinaria (Schumach.) Rauschert. (1989)

Synonyms
- R. sanguinea Bull. Fr. (1803)

= Russula sanguinaria =

Russula sanguinaria Mycological characteristics
- Gills on hymenium
- Cap is convex or depressed
- Hymenium is adnate or decurrent
- Stipe is bare
- Spore print is cream
- Edibility is inedible

Russula sanguinaria, commonly known as the bloody brittlegill or rosey russula, is a strikingly coloured mushroom of the genus Russula, which has the common name of brittlegills. It is bright blood-red, inedible, and grows in association with coniferous trees. It was previously widely known as Russula sanguinea.

== Taxonomy ==
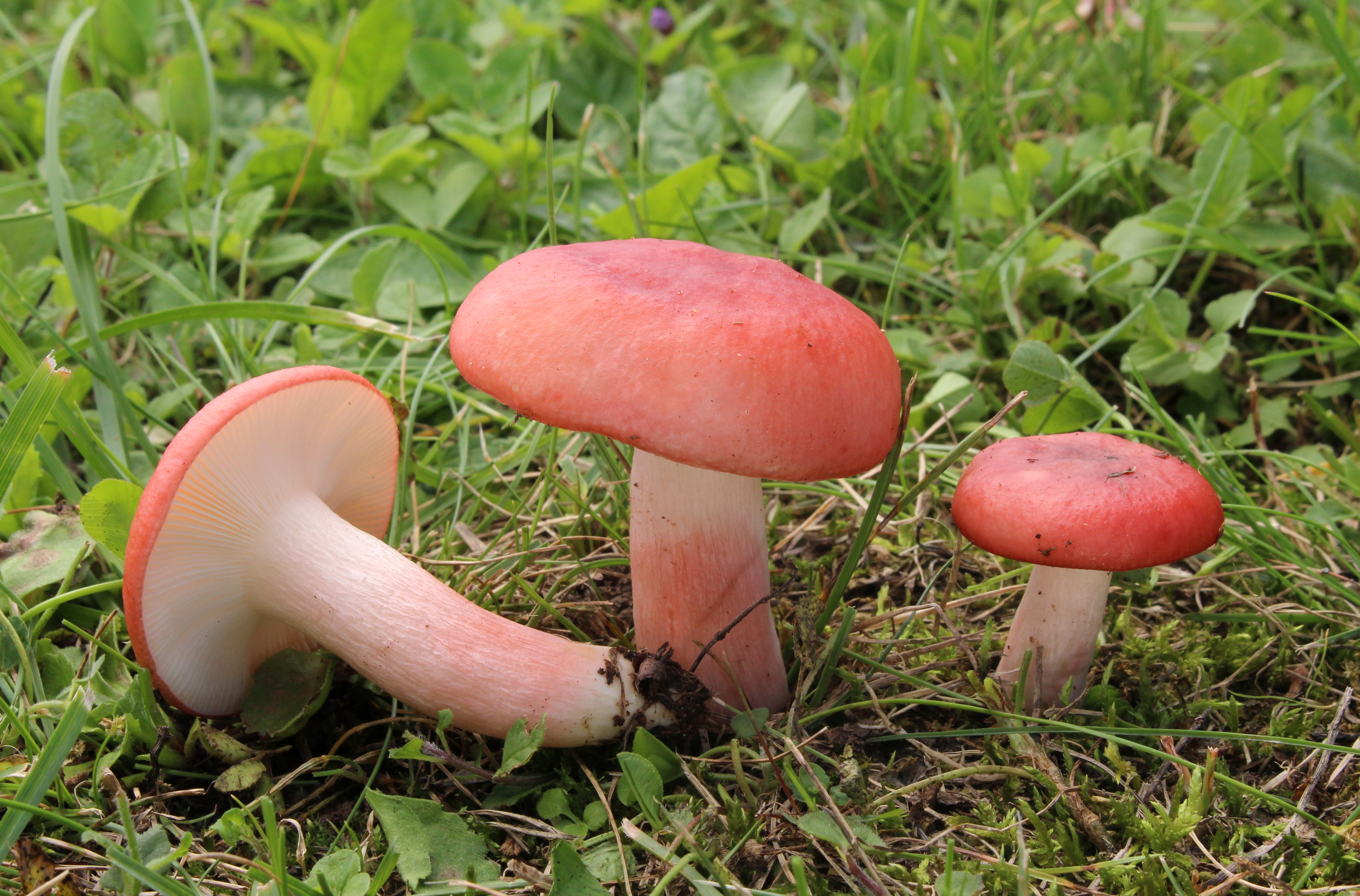
Russula sanguinaria in Germany, Schelklingen, Hausen

The bloody brittlegill was first described as Agaricus sanguinarius by Heinrich Christian Friedrich Schumacher in 1803, and redescribed under its current binomial name by mycologist Stephan Rauschert in 1989. Agaricus sanguinea was described by Bulliard and renamed Russula sanguinea by Elias Magnus Fries.

Both the specific epithets sanguinaria and sanguinea are derived from the Latin word sanguis ('blood'), a reference to the mushroom's colour. According to David Arora in 1986, it was unclear whether this European species is the same as the American species Russula rosacea. According to a 2012 field guide, they are the same.

== Description ==
The robust cap grows up to 10 cm (4 in) in diameter. At first it is convex, but later flattens, and sometimes becomes saucer-shaped when mature. It is bright blood-red, or rose coloured at first, fading slightly with age, and often having paler areas. The cap skin peels at the margin only. The stem is firmly robust, occasionally white, but more commonly flushed with the cap colour. It is streaked vertically, and tends to turn greyish pink with age. The cream to pale ochre gills are adnate to slightly decurrent, narrow and forking. The spore print is also cream to pale ochre. The flesh is white, somewhat hot and peppery, and sometimes bitter on the tongue, with a faint fruity smell.

=== Similar species ===
- Russula helodes is macroscopically identical, but tends to favour sphagnum moss in coniferous forests, and is much rarer.
- Russula emetica (Schaeff.) Pers. grows in the same habitat, and has a bright red cap. It almost never has a coloured stipe, and is very crumbly and fragile.

Most of the other common bright red Russula species grow with deciduous trees.

== Distribution and habitat ==
Russula sanguinaria appears in summer and autumn. It is widespread in the northern temperate zones, and is mycorrhizal with softwood trees, often Pinus (pine) in coniferous woodland, on sandy soils.

== Edibility ==
This mushroom is inedible; it has a 'peppery' taste, and is sometimes quite bitter. Many similar-tasting Russulas are poisonous when eaten raw. The symptoms are mainly gastrointestinal in nature: diarrhoea, vomiting and colicky abdominal cramps. The active agent has not been identified but is thought to consist of sesquiterpenes, which have been isolated from Russula sardonia, and the related genus Lactarius.

== See also ==
- List of Russula species
