= Triplax mesosternalis =

Scientific classification
- Kingdom: Animalia
- Phylum: Arthropoda
- Clade: Pancrustacea
- Class: Insecta
- Order: Coleoptera
- Suborder: Polyphaga
- Infraorder: Cucujiformia
- Family: Erotylidae
- Genus: Triplax
- Species: T. mesosternalis

Binomial name
- Triplax mesosternalis Schaeffer, 1905

Synonyms
- Triplax coloradana Casey, 1924; Triplax monostigma Casey, 1916

Species of beetle

Triplax mesosternalis is a North American species of small pleasing fungus beetle (family Erotylidae). It is placed in subfamily Tritominae (formerly Triplacinae), or – in taxonomic arrangements that prefer a more comprehensive subfamily Erotylinae – in tribe Tritomini of the Erotylinae.

This species is possibly one of the "breast-plated" pleasing fungus beetles of the Triplax thoracica cryptic species complex. This large group, other than T.thoracica and perhaps T.mesosternalis, also includes T.californica, T.cuneata, T.dissimulator, T.errans, T.flavicollis, T.frosti, T.lacensis, T.microgaster, T.puncticeps and T.wehrlei.

== Description ==
Adults of this beetle are about 3.3-5.2 mm long and 1.5-2.4 mm wide. Their elongated body has smoothly curving sides; it is slightly shiny and mostly bare, with conspicuous hair only on the abdomen. Like in many of their relatives, head and prothorax are reddish-orange, while the elytra are black. The tell-tale mark of this species is a round black spot between the middle of the pronotum and its forward edge. Usually, there are also two much smaller rund black spots on the pronotum, on each side halfway between the center and the outer edge; these are often tiny, however, and entirely absent in some individuals. As usual for the members of the "breast-plated" species complex, T.mesosternalis has orange legs (although the hindleg coxae are blackish in this species) and antenna bases, and lacks a conspicuous margin to the forehead sides, which also form a well-rounded obtuse angle towards the mouth. The underside is orange up to the mesothorax, which is orange in the center and on the forward half of the sides; the rear part of the mesothorax sides is brown to black, and the metathorax and abdomen are black. The "stalk" of the antennae is reddish-brown, and the "club" forming the antenna tips is black.

Unlike most Triplax species, T.mesosternalis is more easily identified with a simple magnifying glass without resorting to microscopic details of its anatomy. Within its range, the pronotal spotting pattern is distinctive for this species, whereas its anatomy combines features typical for the "breast-plated" species complex with other traits typically found in the T.macra complex.

Head
The head is elongate-oval and well visible from above; it has small compound eyes with tiny ommatidia, indicating a diurnal or crepuscular lifestyle, but with overall rather little reliance on eyesight; it is densely sprinkled with small punctures, which at the sides towards the eyes and "neck" become notably larger and less dense. All T.mesosternalis adults possess file-like structures at the sides of the neck attachment, which, when the beetle wiggles its head, rub against the chitin and produce a squeaking sound; these structures are developed similarly to those of, e.g., the unrelated pleasing fungus beetle Dacne pubescens. The ocular striae end above the antenna attachments; the epistome, unlike in T.macra and its relatives, lacks a conspicuous margin (though the sides are vaguely margined) and has a sharply rounded angle between the straight sides and the tip; the latter is almost straight, with a slight concavity in the center. The "cheek" lobes below the compound eyes are small and when seen from below do not reach the eyes; their almost parallel sides have rounded edges. Unlike in its presumed closest relatives, but like in T.macra, the length of the 11-segmented antenna is almost 90% of the pronotal base width; as usual for Triplax, antenna segment 3 is shorter than the segments 4 and 5 together. The "stem" of the antenna has sparse short silvery bristles and bears a "clubbed" antenna tip, which consists of the last three segments (9-11) and is more than twice as long as it is wide and not very compact; antenna segment 8 is slightly triangular, with a wider tip, but only about half as wide as the base of the "club".

As for the mouthparts, the galea and lacinia of the maxilla resemble those of the related genus Tritoma, the galea being almost triangular, with a tip carrying sparse bristles at the outer side and a dense pack of bristles on the inner side. The lacinia is also covered in dense bristles, and – unlike in Tritoma – at the tip has two small black incurved teeth, set so closely together that they may appear as a single tooth. The maxillary palps curve inwards and have a first segment that is at least as long as segments 2 and 3 together. Their end segment is somewhat triangular, abruptly cut-off, and more than twice as wide as it is long. Its tip carries a small brush, which consists of a single row of microscopic fleshy finger-like cylinders, which on their sides have many small bristles. The labium has a mentum that is fairly narrow, angular and moderately sized, with shortened sides; however, between individuals, size and shape of the mentum are somewhat variable. The labial palps end in a widened hatchet-shaped segment, which is sparsely covered in short bristles, with a longer strong bristle at the outer side. At its tip, it has a tiny brush, much smaller than that at the end of the maxillary palps, and composed of a single row of short smooth nubs.

Body, wings and legs
The prothorax is almost as wide at the base as the wings at their widest point and narrower at the front, giving it a trapezoidal shape. The pronotum is also trapezoid-shaped, with the rear edge around two-thirds again as long as the forward edge; its sides strongly curve at least in front, and in individuals with widened pronotum also in the rear. A thin margin runs around the sides and rear of the pronotum, but is absent from the front between the compound eyes. In each corner of the pronotum, there is a sizeable navel-shaped pore; also, the pronotum is covered in moderately-sized punctuations which become somewhat larger and denser towards the sides, where they are separated by at most their diameter; in the rear corners, there is a row of larger punctures, followed towards the center of the pronotum by an area of much smaller punctures. The sclerites of prosternum, pronotal epipleura, mesosternum, metepisternum and metepimeres are all distinct, and the prosternum and metasternum lack clearly visible lengthwise lines from the center margin of the leg attachments to the rear edge of the prosternum. The abdomen consists of 5 sternites, with the first being the widest; lines between the hindleg attachments run along its base, which protrudes as a narrow bent process between the hindleg attachments.

The scutellum is bluntly pentagonal to almost heart-shaped. The elytra have a distinct margin at the base; they are ornamented with regular lines of mid-sized punctuations, with a dense scattering of very tiny punctures in between these lines and also a microscopic reticulated surface structure which dulls their sheen. The attachments of each leg pair are set narrowly together; the fore- and mid-leg coxae are almost ball-shaped, while those of the hindlegs are wider than long. The trochanters of the hindlegs have a right triangle shape, and the femora are slightly thickened. The tibiae are slightly widened towards the tip (often, but not reliably, slightly wider in males) except on the barely widened forelegs, and have a bluntly rounded upper/outer edge. On the 5-segmented tarsi, segment 4 is reduced, attached to the upper centerside of segment 3, and firmly joined to the base segment 5; segment 3 is straight or almost so on all sides.

The aedeagus of the male genitalia has narrow tegminal arms, down- and forward-curving dorsal struts of the tegmen, and lateral lobes which attach to the tip of the basal piece. The median lobe is slightly curved, with a tipwards membrane at the back surrounding a hole in the center. Where the median lobe meets the median strut, at the rear end of the sclerotized stripes there are two small black patches, which in side view are curved. The internal sac has indistinct weakly sclerotized patches at the rear back, followed tipwards by a distinct darker and more strongly sclerotized patch. Like in other members of its species complex, a conspicuous black muscle attachment is located at the forward end of the internal sac, but the tip itself is notably shortened in T.mesosternalis. The ejaculatory duct is long and constantly thick for most of its length; its tip tapers abruptly in the region of the median lobe. The female genitalia are fairly generic, resembling those of other Erotylidae such as Megalodacne, which within the pleasing fungus beetle family is not particularly closely related to Triplax. But while they are proportionally smaller in width compared to the larger-bodied Megalodacne (just like in all Triplax) except for the larger basal segments of the valvifers and the paraprocts, almost all parts are drastically shortened in length compared to e.g. Triplax macra. However, the styli are sized as in most other Triplax species, and the proctigeral lobe is comparatively oversized, extending up to the valvifer tips. Tergite 8 except for being longer and narrower resembles that of Haematochiton in having strongly sclerotized lines along the sides, and in the centerline near the tip a deep but narrow membranous indentation. As typical for its species complex, T.thoracica has the stabilizing straps at the rearward end of the eighth tergite and sternite conspicuously shortened.

== Distribution and ecology ==
The lectotype, an adult of unknown sex, was only established more than half a century after this species' description. It was originally part of a 5-cotype series (Brooklyn Museum collection 42600 at the USNM) that was collected at Palmerlee in Cochise County, Arizona (mis-spelled "Palmerly" on the specimen label), probably in late 1904 or early 1905. Palmerlee – known as "Reef" before 1904, and after 1911 as "Garces" – is an abandoned mining settlement in Miller Canyon, Huachuca Mountains, at the site of the present-day Miller Canyon Recreation Area and trailhead on the northeastern slopes of Miller Peak, at almost 6,000 ft (1,800 m) AMSL. Apart from Arizona, this species has been reported from New Mexico, Colorado, and Kansas. From Mexico few reliable data exist, but a specimen was identified from Chiapas State, less than 250 km from Mexico's southeastern border, suggesting T.mesosternalis is widespread across the country but probably not common or easily found, and might even range further eastwards.

Its distribution seems to run along the eastern foothills of the Rocky Mountains. In Arizona, it occurs from the east at least to Prescott; in New Mexico it ranges from the west at least to Cloudcroft, Las Vegas, and Ponil Canyon in Colfax County northwest of Cimarron. In Colorado, it is found westwards at least to Gunnison, Colorado and Pagosa Springs, Colorado, and northwards to Fort Collins, Colorado, near the border to Wyoming; possibly, its range extends to that state. While it occurs at Colorado Springs, Colorado, it might actually range much further east, given the rather isolated record from Douglas County, in eastern Kansas, more than 500 miles (800 km) east of Colorado Springs. Whether the Douglas County record is genuine remains to be determined; it stands out not only due to its distance from the species' core range and habitat, but also because it is in the lowlands, at just 900 ft (270 m) AMSL, whereas the other records, as far as is known, are from the Rocky Mountain foothills, between about 5,000-8,000 ft (1,500-2,400 m).

T.mesosternalis is active in the summer months, with specimens collected from early May to late August. While its food is not known, T.mesosternalis presumably eats fungi as larvae and adults, like the other members of the T.thoracica with a strong preference for oyster mushrooms (Pleurotus; Agaricales: Pleurotaceae) such as common oyster mushroom (Pleurotus ostreatus).
