= Triplax dissimulator =

Scientific classification
- Kingdom: Animalia
- Phylum: Arthropoda
- Clade: Pancrustacea
- Class: Insecta
- Order: Coleoptera
- Suborder: Polyphaga
- Infraorder: Cucujiformia
- Family: Erotylidae
- Genus: Triplax
- Species: T. dissimulator

Binomial name
- Triplax dissimulator (Crotch, 1873)

Synonyms
- Mycotretus dissimulator Crotch, 1873; Triplax carri Casey, 1924; Tritoma dissimulator (Crotch, 1873)

Species of beetle

Triplax dissimulator is a North American species of small pleasing fungus beetle (family Erotylidae). It is placed in subfamily Tritominae (formerly Triplacinae), or – in taxonomic arrangements that prefer a more comprehensive subfamily Erotylinae – in tribe Tritomini of the Erotylinae.

== Description ==
Adults of this beetle are about 3-4.8 mm long and 1.6-2.6 mm wide; their elongated elliptical body is very broad for a Triplax, less than twice as long as it is wide. It resembles the closely related genus Tritoma in proportions, but its pronotum and basal half of the wing sides are almost parallel, not distinctly curving as is usual for Tritoma. The surface of the carapace is mostly bare or almost so, with conspicuous hair only on the abdomen. Like in many of their relatives, head and pronotum are reddish-orange, while the elytra are black and slightly shiny. Unusual for a Triplax, the centerline of the pronotum has two black spots, one at the front and one at the back side of the pronotum; these spots may be vestigial, usually they are immediately obvious. Most commonly the spots are slightly pointed towards the center of the pronotum; in some individuals they are larger and connect to form a broad lengthwise stripe, which has an hourglass shape except in the most large-spotted specimens. As usual for the members of the "breast-plated" species complex, T.flavicollis has orange antenna bases and legs; its hindleg coxae are black, however, and the coxae of its middle legs are brown. The "stem" of the antennae is orange like the base, while the "clubbed" antenna tip is brown to black. The abdomen is roughly half black (in front), half orange (in the rear); the exact proportion of the colors can vary either way, but in any case the abdomen is at least one-third black or orange.

Head
The head has small compound eyes with tiny ommatidia, indicating a diurnal or crepuscular lifestyle, but with overall rather little reliance on eyesight; it is sprinkled with small punctures, each separated from the next by at least twice their diameter, and also has a microscopic reticulated relief that makes the surface less shiny. All T.dissimulator adults possess file-like structures at the sides of the neck attachment, which, when the beetle wiggles its head, rub against the chitin and produce a squeaking sound; these structures are developed similarly to those of, e.g., the unrelated pleasing fungus beetle Dacne pubescens. The ocular striae end above the antenna attachments, and the epistome is conspicuously widened, with shallow impressions on each side near the mid-line. Its sides bulge slightly and broadly curve towards the tip, which has a distinct concave notch. Unusually for one of the "breast-plated" Triplax species, along the sides of the epistome there is a distinct margin like in the more distantly related T.macra species complex; the margin gets wider towards the epistome tip, across which it continues indistinctly and even wider. The "cheek" lobes below the compound eyes are long, with side edges which are strongly rounded towards the tips and rearwards run almost parallel. The antenna are conspicuously short in this Triplax, less than two-thirds of the pronotal base width; as usual in this genus, their segment 3 is shorter than the segments 4 and 5 together. The "stem" of the antenna has sparse short silvery bristles and bears a "clubbed" antenna tip, which in this species is formed by the last three segments (9-11) and about twice as long as it is wide.

As for the mouthparts, the galea and lacinia of the maxilla resemble those of the related genus Tritoma, the galea being almost triangular, with a tip carrying sparse bristles at the outer side and a dense pack of bristles on the inner side. The lacinia is also covered in dense bristles, and – unlike in Tritoma – at the tip has two small black incurved teeth, set so closely together that they may appear as a single tooth. The maxillary palps curve inwards and have a first segment that is at least as long as segments 2 and 3 together. Their end segment is somewhat triangular, abruptly cut-off, and about 2.5 times as wide as it is long. Its tip carries a small brush, which consists of a single row of microscopic fleshy finger-like cylinders, which on their sides have many small bristles. The labium has a mentum that is moderately-sized, with almost parallel sides; however, between individuals, size and shape of the mentum are somewhat variable. The labial palps end in a widened hatchet-shaped segment, which is sparsely covered in short bristles, with a longer strong bristle at the outer side. At its tip, it has a tiny brush, much smaller than that at the end of the maxillary palps, and composed of a single row of short smooth nubs.

Body, wings and legs
The prothorax is almost as wide at the base as the wings at their widest point. The pronotum is almost rectangular, its sides evenly and strongly curve towards the blunt edges in front. The basal lobe of the pronotum is pronounced but narrow, only the central 20% of the pronotum width. A thin margin runs around the sides and rear of the pronotum, but is absent from the front between the compound eyes. In each corner of the pronotum, there is a sizeable navel-shaped pore, and the pronotum as well as the entire underside have the same pattern of punctuations as the head; at least the pronotum also has the microscopic reticulated structure. The prosternum and metasternum lack clearly visible lengthwise lines from the center margin of the leg attachments to the rear edge of the prosternum. On the base of the abdomen, lines between the hindleg attachments run along the tip of the abdomen, which protrudes as a narrow bent process between the hindleg attachments.

The scutellum is bluntly pentagonal to almost heart-shaped. The elytra have a distinct margin at the base; they are ornamented with regular lines of mid-sized punctuations; between these lines the elytra are somewhat dulled by the microscopic reticulated pattern. In addition, the spaces between the punctured lines feature irregularly small punctures, scattered about twice as dense as are the punctures which make up the stripes. The attachments of each leg pair are set narrowly together. The tibiae are slightly widened towards the tip (often, but not reliably, slightly wider in males) except on the barely widened forelegs, and have a bluntly rounded upper/outer edge. Segment 4 of the tarsi is reduced, attached to the upper centerside of segment 3, and firmly joined to the base segment 5.

The aedeagus of the male genitalia has narrow tegminal arms, down- and forward-curving dorsal struts of the tegmen, and lateral lobes which attach to the tip of the basal piece. On the basal piece of the tegmen, there are conspicuous sclerotized patches bordered by darker lines.

The tip of the median lobe narrows to a sharp point; the body of the lobe has a small membrane at the back which surrounds a hole in the center. The internal sac is somewhat shorter than in T.thoracica, extending forward only to the middle of the median strut. Unlike in other "breast-plated" Triplax, it is almost entirely covered in sclerotized patches all the way from the forward end close to the central hole of the median lobe, obscuring the conspicuous black muscle attachment near the forward tip of the internal sac that is clearly visible in other members of its species complex. The ejaculatory duct is distinct from T.errans, T.flavicollis and T.wehrlei; it is thin and long, extends about to the middle of the median lobe, and its rear last fifth froms a spiral. The female genitalia are fairly generic, resembling those of other Erotylidae such as Megalodacne, which within the pleasing fungus beetle family is not particularly closely related to Triplax. But while they are proportionally smaller in width compared to the larger-bodied Megalodacne (just like in all Triplax) except for the larger basal segments of the valvifers and the paraprocts, almost all parts are drastically shortened in length compared to e.g. Triplax macra. However, the styli are sized as in most other Triplax species, and the proctigeral lobe is comparatively oversized, extending up to the valvifer tips. Tergite 8 except for being longer and narrower resembles that of Haematochiton in having strongly sclerotized lines along the sides, and in the centerline near the tip a deep but narrow membranous indentation.

== Systematics ==
Initially placed in Mycotretus and assigned to Tritoma by some earlier authors, this species may be one of the "breast-plated" pleasing fungus beetles of the Triplax thoracica cryptic species complex. This large group, other than T.thoracica and T.dissimulator, is also presumed to include T.californica, T.cuneata, T.errans, T.flavicollis, T.frosti, T.lacensis, T.mesosternalis, T.microgaster, T.puncticeps and T.wehrlei.

Its closest relatives are possibly T.errans, T.flavicollis and T.wehrlei, all of which are easily distinguished by their coloration. Among North American Triplax, T.dissimulator is unique due to its wide body and pronotal pattern.

However, an Erotylidae COI phylogeny including 9 Triplax species failed to resolve any well-supported relationships between these; instead, Triplax formed a paraphyletic and probably artefactual assemblage with the closely related Aporotritoma pulchra, Tritoma bipustulata and Ischyrus quadripunctatus, as well as the entire Erotylinae (or Erotylini if Triplax is included in Erotylidae) which resolved as sister to Aporotritima/Tritoma. The study did not aim at understanding relationships among Triplax, but to provide a framework of higher-level Erotylidae lineages; misrooting, long branch attraction or similar errors are likely to have confounded the phylogeny at the species level. The analysis placed T.dissimulator closer to the European T.rufipes, but with the typical signs of long branch attraction; in particular the position of T.thoracica was all but unresolvable. Neither T.errans, T.flavicollis nor T.wehrlei were included in this analysis.

== Distribution and ecology ==
The type locality of Triplax dissimulator is no more precise than "Illinois". It is one of the most northernly members of its genus in North America, occurring in the northeastern USA and south-central Canada with a similar distribution as T.frosti, in an arc running southeast to west along the huge prehistoric Lake Agassiz-Ojibway. From Quebec and Maine, it ranges south to New Jersey, and westwards across the Great Lakes region at least to Alberta in the north and Minnesota in the south.

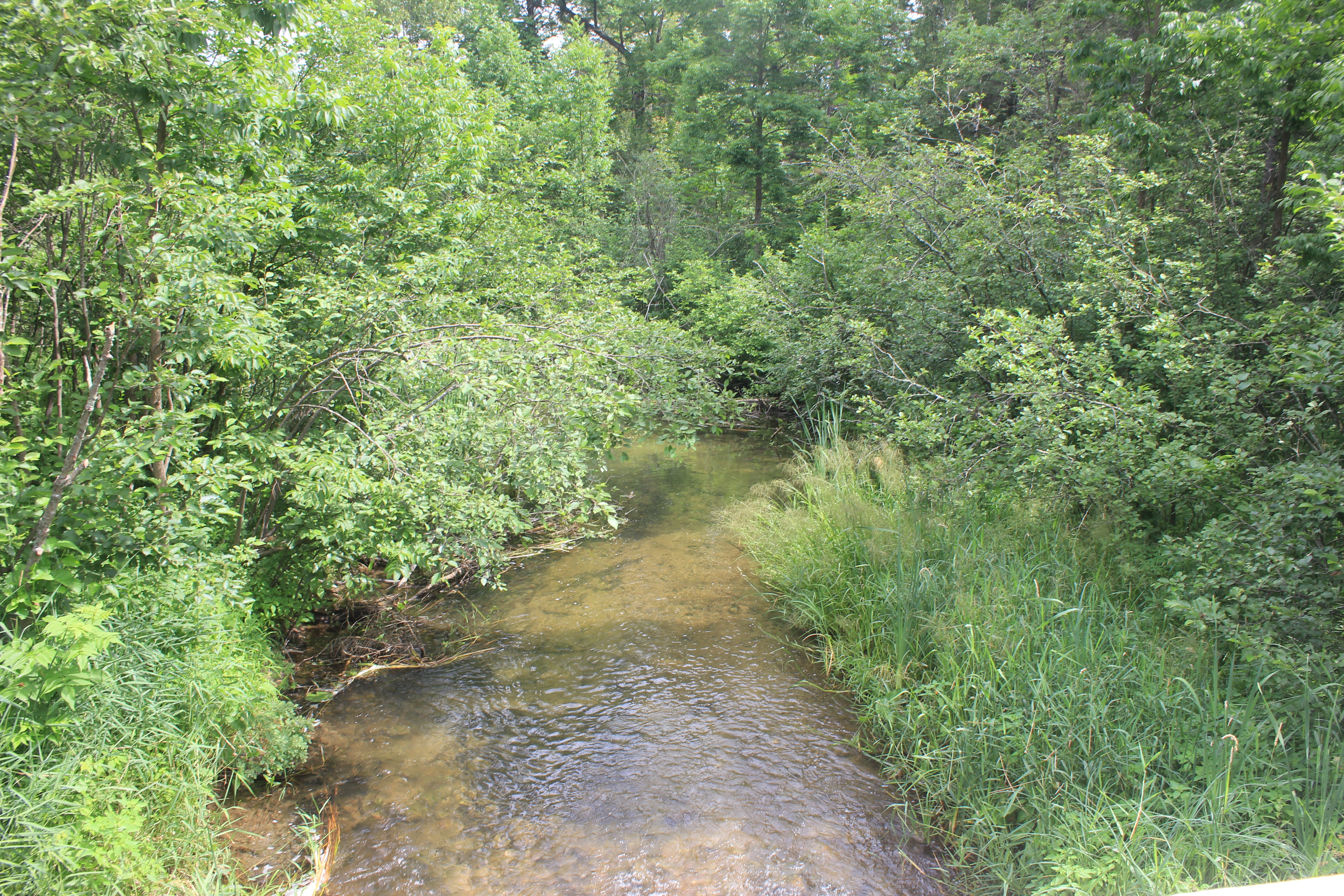
The Mississippi River near its source in Itasca State Park runs through T.dissimulator habitat

Its northern extent is at least to St. Patrick's, Prince Edward Island, Morar, Nova Scotia, Hovey Hill in Richmond Parish, New Brunswick, Duparquet, Quebec, Malachi, Ontario, the Criddle/Vane Homestead Provincial Park ("Aweme") in Manitoba, and Edwand and Fort McMurray in Alberta. To what extent records from Alaska are genuine or due to misattributed or human-introduced specimens is unclear; the region is generally considered outside the natural range of Triplax. The southern limit of its range is even less well known. It occurs south at least to Newark, New Jersey and Harrisburg, Pennsylvania, but its distribution westwards to Illinois and Wisconsin is largely conjectural. In Minnesota, where it is perhaps most comprehensively attested, it occurs west at least to Itasca State Park. There is also one specimen supposedly collected in New Braunfels, Texas, but this is more likely just a labeling error; likewise, records from South Dakota in the west and from Florida in the southeast require confirmation.

Adults are active mainly in the summer months, due to their rather northernly range; although the species is widespread and seems to be fairly common, they are rarely seen before mid-May and after July. Records from Six Mile Creek in Ithaca, New York, on a May 2, on Hovey Hill on an August 19, and in Springfield, Massachusetts, on an August 20 are more unusual, but active individuals of T.dissimulator have been found at Duparquet near the north end of its range as late as September 2, while a November 2 record from the same locality is exceptional and may refer to hibernating adults. The species' tolerance for cold is also shown by its occurrence near the summit of Mount Washington, New Hampshire, at an elevation of about 6,200 ft (1,900 m) AMSL, where it was found on July 7, 1939 – despite being the hottest time of the year at this site, air temperatures at the time of collection were just 60°C (16°C).

As typical for its species complex, T.dissimulator has a strong preference for oyster mushrooms (Pleurotus; Agaricales: Pleurotaceae) as larvae and adults; usually, these beetles are recorded on the common oyster mushroom (Pleurotus ostreatus). The larvae in particular may not be able to eat any other food. T.dissimulator is commonly associated with poplars and aspens (Populus) such as the American aspen (Populus tremuloides), but it has also been recorded from hardwood forests, as well as conifer (such as black spruce Picea mariana) stands. Most likely, it seeks out particular tree species because they are suitable hosts for the fungi this beetle prefers, not for the trees in and by themselves. Unlike most other pleasing fungus beetles, where each species keeps to itself, T.dissimulator is more sociable. It has been found together with T.frosti and T.thoracica, two other members of its species complex, on the same fungus. While they are also occasionally found in funnel traps, this species is very often caught on the wing in flight interception traps, in particular in June.
