= Triplax puncticeps =

Scientific classification
- Kingdom: Animalia
- Phylum: Arthropoda
- Clade: Pancrustacea
- Class: Insecta
- Order: Coleoptera
- Suborder: Polyphaga
- Infraorder: Cucujiformia
- Family: Erotylidae
- Genus: Triplax
- Species: T. puncticeps

Binomial name
- Triplax puncticeps Casey, 1916

Species of beetle

Triplax puncticeps is small species of small pleasing fungus beetle (family Erotylidae) endemic to the USA. It is placed in subfamily Tritominae (formerly Triplacinae), or – in taxonomic arrangements that prefer a more comprehensive subfamily Erotylinae – in tribe Tritomini of the Erotylinae.

This species is probably one of the "breast-plated" pleasing fungus beetles of the Triplax thoracica cryptic species complex. This large group, other than T.thoracica and T.puncticeps, also includes T.californica, T.cuneata, T.dissimulator, T.errans, T.flavicollis, T.frosti, T.lacensis, T.mesosternalis, T.microgaster and T.wehrlei.

== Description ==
Adults of this beetle are about 3.7-5.7 mm long and 1.5-2.7 mm wide, with an elongated and almost parallel-sided body. Like in many of their relatives, head and pronotum are reddish-orange, while the shiny elytra and the scutellum are black. As usual for the members of the "breast-plated" species complex, T.frosti has orange legs and antenna bases. The "stems" of its antennae are dark brown beyond the first two segments, and the black segments 9-11 forming elongated "clubs".

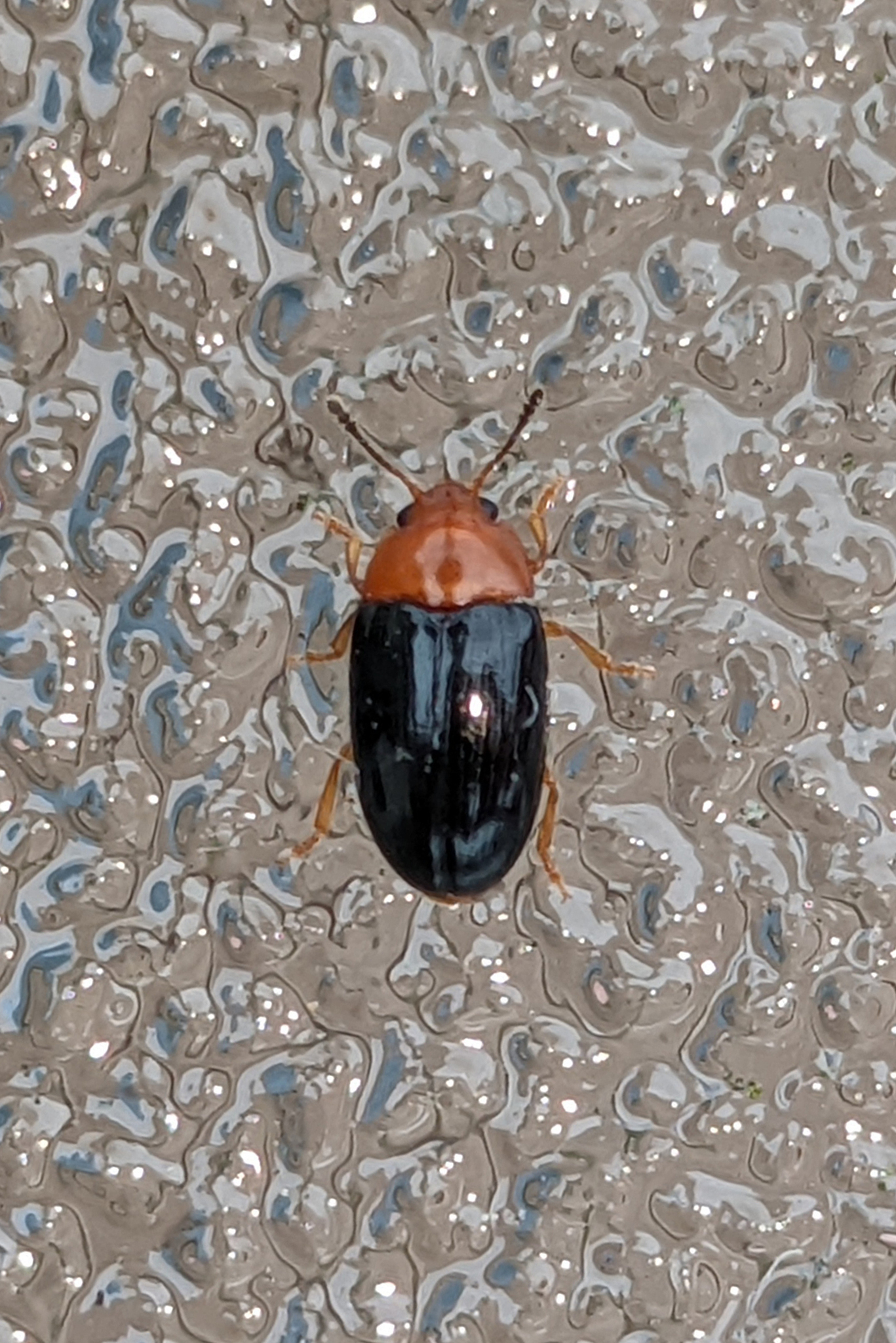
The widespread Triplax thoracica looks almost the same as T.puncticeps, but differs in microscopic anatomical details

It can be distinguished from most other Triplax – even very close relatives – by having an all-orange underside, no distinct margin at the base of the elytra, and in particular the unusually (by North American Triplax standards) slender maxillary palp tips which are more than half as long as they are wide. Like the other members of its species complex, it lacks a conspicuous margin to the forehead sides, which also form a well-rounded obtuse angle towards the mouth. It may be most closely related to T.lacensis and T.microgaster which have similar male genitalia, but is immediately distinguished from these by its all-black elytra. Strikingly similar to Triplax frosti and T.thoracica in color and anatomy, these differ in the male genital details, and (already visible with a magnifying glass without harming the beetle) the last segment of the maxillary palps, which in those two species is three times as wide as it is long – more than half again as wide as it is T.puncticeps.

Head
The head has small compound eyes with tiny ommatidia, indicating a diurnal or crepuscular lifestyle, but with overall rather little reliance on eyesight; it is densely sprinkled with large punctures, which between the compound eyes almost cover the entire surface. Male T.puncticeps adults possess file-like structures at the sides of the neck attachment, which, when the beetle wiggles its head, rub against the chitin and produce a squeaking sound; these structures are developed similarly to those of, e.g., Dacne pubescens, and are absent in T.puncticeps females. The ocular striae end above the antenna attachments; the epistome lacks a margin and has a well-rounded transition between the straight sides and the tip, the latter being almost straight with a slight concavity in the center.

The "cheek" lobes below the compound eyes are small, with somewhat rounded side edges. The antenna length is two-thirds of the pronotal base width, with antenna segment 3 shorter than the segments 4 and 5 together. The "stem" of the antenna has sparse short silvery bristles and bears a "clubbed" antenna tip, which consists of the last three segments (9-11) and is more than twice as long as it is wide.

As for the mouthparts, the galea and lacinia of the maxilla resemble those of the related genus Tritoma, the galea being almost triangular, with a tip carrying sparse bristles at the outer side and a dense pack of bristles on the inner side. The lacinia is also covered in dense bristles, and – unlike in Tritoma – at the tip has two small black incurved teeth, set so closely together that they may appear as a single tooth. The maxillary palps curve inwards and have a first segment that is at least as long as segments 2 and 3 together. Their end segment is somewhat triangular, abruptly cut-off, and less widened than in other North American Triplax – usually not even twice as wide as it is long. Its tip carries a small brush, which consists of a single row of microscopic fleshy finger-like cylinders, which on their sides have many small bristles. The labium has a mentum that is fairly narrow, angular and comparatively large, with almost parallel sides; however, between individuals, size and shape of the mentum are somewhat variable. The labial palps end in a widened hatchet-shaped segment, which is sparsely covered in short bristles, with a longer strong bristle at the outer side. At its tip, it has a tiny brush, much smaller than that at the end of the maxillary palps, and composed of a single row of short smooth nubs.

Body, wings and legs
The prothorax is almost as wide at the base as the wings at their widest point. The pronotum is trapezoid-shaped, with the rear edge around two-thirds again as long as the forward edge; its sides strongly curve towards the front. A thin margin runs around the sides and rear of the pronotum, but is absent from the front between the compound eyes. In each corner of the pronotum, there is a sizeable navel-shaped pore, and the pronotum is fairly sparsely covered in moderately-sized punctuations, which become slightly denser towards the sides. The prosternum and metasternum lack clearly visible lengthwise lines from the center margin of the leg attachments to the rear edge of the prosternum. On the base of the abdomen, lines between the hindleg attachments run along the tip of the abdomen, which protrudes as a narrow bent process between the hindleg attachments.

The scutellum is bluntly pentagonal, almost heart-shaped. The elytra lack a distinct margin at the base; they are ornamented with regular lines of mid-sized punctuations, and very sparse punctures of similar size scattered irregularly in the otherwise smooth and unstructured spaces between these lines. The attachments of each leg pair are set narrowly together. The tibiae are slightly widened towards the tip (often, but not reliably, slightly wider in males) except on the barely widened forelegs, and have a bluntly rounded upper/outer edge. Segment 4 of the tarsi is reduced, attached to the upper centerside of segment 3, and firmly joined to the base segment 5.

The aedeagus of the male genitalia has narrow tegminal arms, down- and forward-curving dorsal struts of the tegmen, and lateral lobes which attach to the tip of the basal piece. The median lobe is slightly curved, with a tipwards membrane at the back surrounding a hole in the center. Where the median lobe meets the median strut, at the rear end of the sclerotized stripes there are two small black patches, which in side view are curved. The large internal sac extends to the median strut; it has long sclerotized stripes at the back, which near their rear end within the median lobe have conspicuous short straight blackened strips. The tipward end of the sclerotized strips forms curls, beneath which the ejaculatory duct extends more or less spiralling, its tapered tip extending towards the median lobe. Like in other members of its species complex, a conspicuous black muscle attachment is located at the forward tip of the internal sac; in T.puncticeps it is stirrup-shaped. The female genitalia are fairly generic, resembling those of other Erotylidae such as Megalodacne, which within the pleasing fungus beetle family is not particularly closely related to Triplax. But while they are proportionally smaller in width compared to the larger-bodied Megalodacne (just like in all Triplax) except for the larger basal segments of the valvifers and the paraprocts, almost all parts are drastically shortened in length compared to e.g. Triplax macra. However, the styli are sized as in most other Triplax species, and the proctigeral lobe is comparatively oversized, extending up to the valvifer tips. Tergite 8 except for being longer and narrower resembles that of Haematochiton in having strongly sclerotized lines along the sides, and in the centerline near the tip a deep but narrow membranous indentation. As typical for its species complex, T.thoracica has the stabilizing straps at the rearward end of the eighth tergite and sternite conspicuously shortened.

== Distribution and ecology ==
The type specimen, USNM 48811 in Thomas Casey Jr.'s collection, is an adult of undetermined sex. Its type locality has variously been claimed as Austin in Travis County, Texas, Austin County, Texas or nearby Columbus, Texas; its label simply has "Tex." for Texas. Either way, the type locality is close to the species' southwestern limit, from where it ranges east to North Carolina. It seems to be a warmth-loving species, with its northern limit is not well known, but extending at least to Tryon, North Carolina and Memphis, Tennessee. Reports from Pennsylvania and even Minnesota require clarification, as they are far from the known range limits. The species is not known from Florida so far, has been confirmed to occur right up to the Gulf of Mexico coast further west.

Unusually, a remarkable proportion of records are of this little-known Triplax from the winter months. In Tallulah, Louisiana, it was found on February 6 and 17, though at least the first record probably pertains to larvae. The Memphis record was on a December 11, as was a find of T.puncticeps "hibernating under willow bark" in Victoria County, Texas, at the hottest and driest southwesternmost end of its range. While its food is not known, it presumably eats fungi as larvae and adults, with a strong preference for oyster mushrooms (Pleurotus; Agaricales: Pleurotaceae) such as common oyster mushroom (Pleurotus ostreatus). The February 6 record from Tallulah was "bred" from a "fungus", suggesting that the larvae develop over winter (P.ostreatus sensu stricto is known to fruit in the cold season). The record from Tryon was from a "Hicoria" (hickory, nowadays Carya sect. Carya), but the beetles would likely have not sought the tree for itself, but for attractive fungi growing on it, or maybe for shelter.
