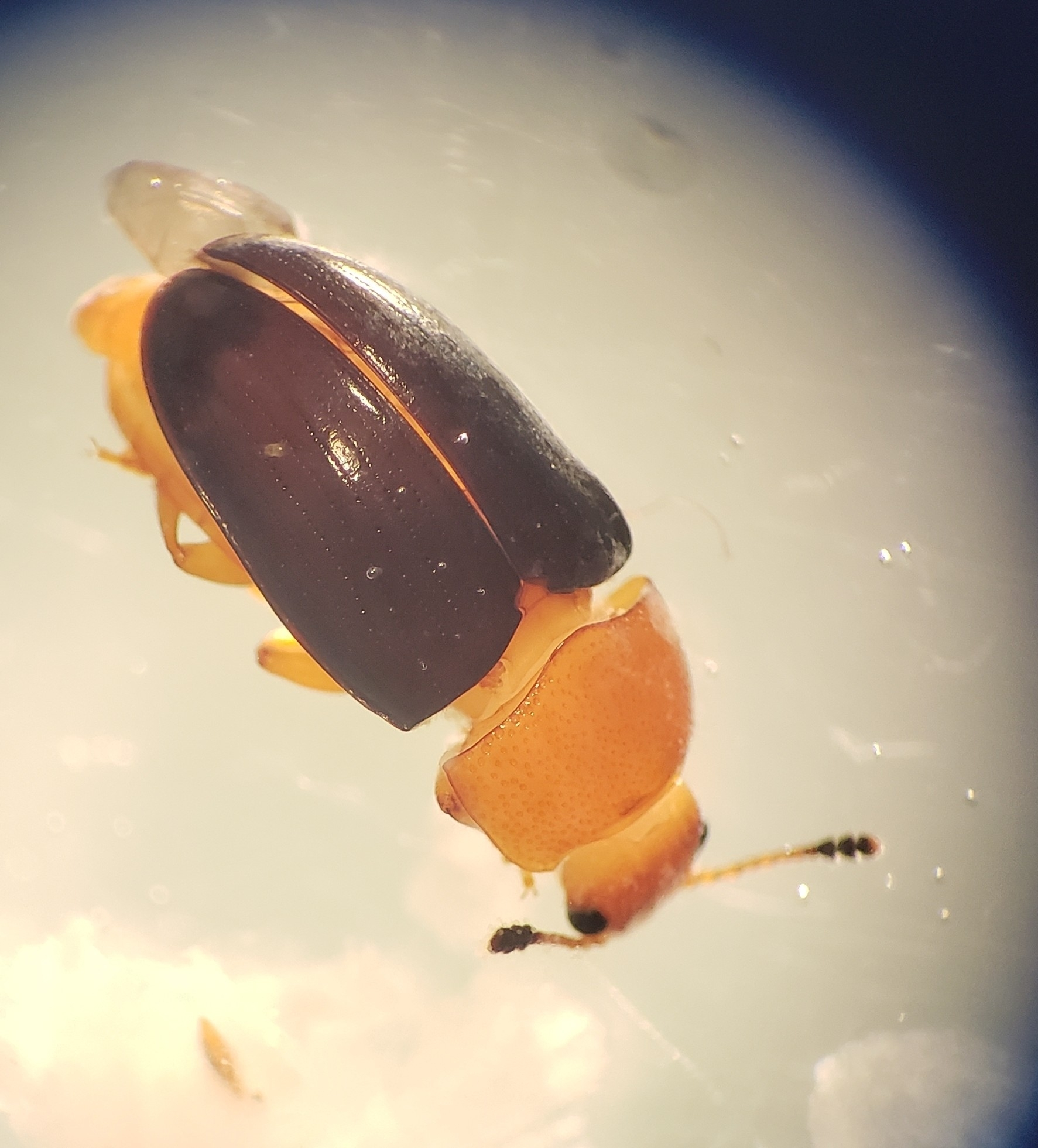
- Adult specimen caught at James H. Barrow Field Station outside Garrettsville, Ohio

Scientific classification
- Kingdom: Animalia
- Phylum: Arthropoda
- Clade: Pancrustacea
- Class: Insecta
- Order: Coleoptera
- Suborder: Polyphaga
- Infraorder: Cucujiformia
- Family: Erotylidae
- Genus: Triplax
- Species: T. frosti

Binomial name
- Triplax frosti Casey, 1924

= Triplax frosti =

Species of beetle

Triplax frosti is a North American species of small pleasing fungus beetle (family Erotylidae). It is placed in subfamily Tritominae (formerly Triplacinae), or – in taxonomic arrangements that prefer a more comprehensive subfamily Erotylinae – in tribe Tritomini of the Erotylinae.

At first, this beetle was considered nothing more than a chance variant of T.thoracica, its presumed closest relative. Due to the comprehensive study of Thomas Casey Jr., these two cryptic species can now be reliably separated. The scientific name honors C.A.Frost, who on June 2, 1912, collected the type specimen (USNM 48810, an adult of undetermined sex) in Hopkinton, Massachusetts.

== Description ==
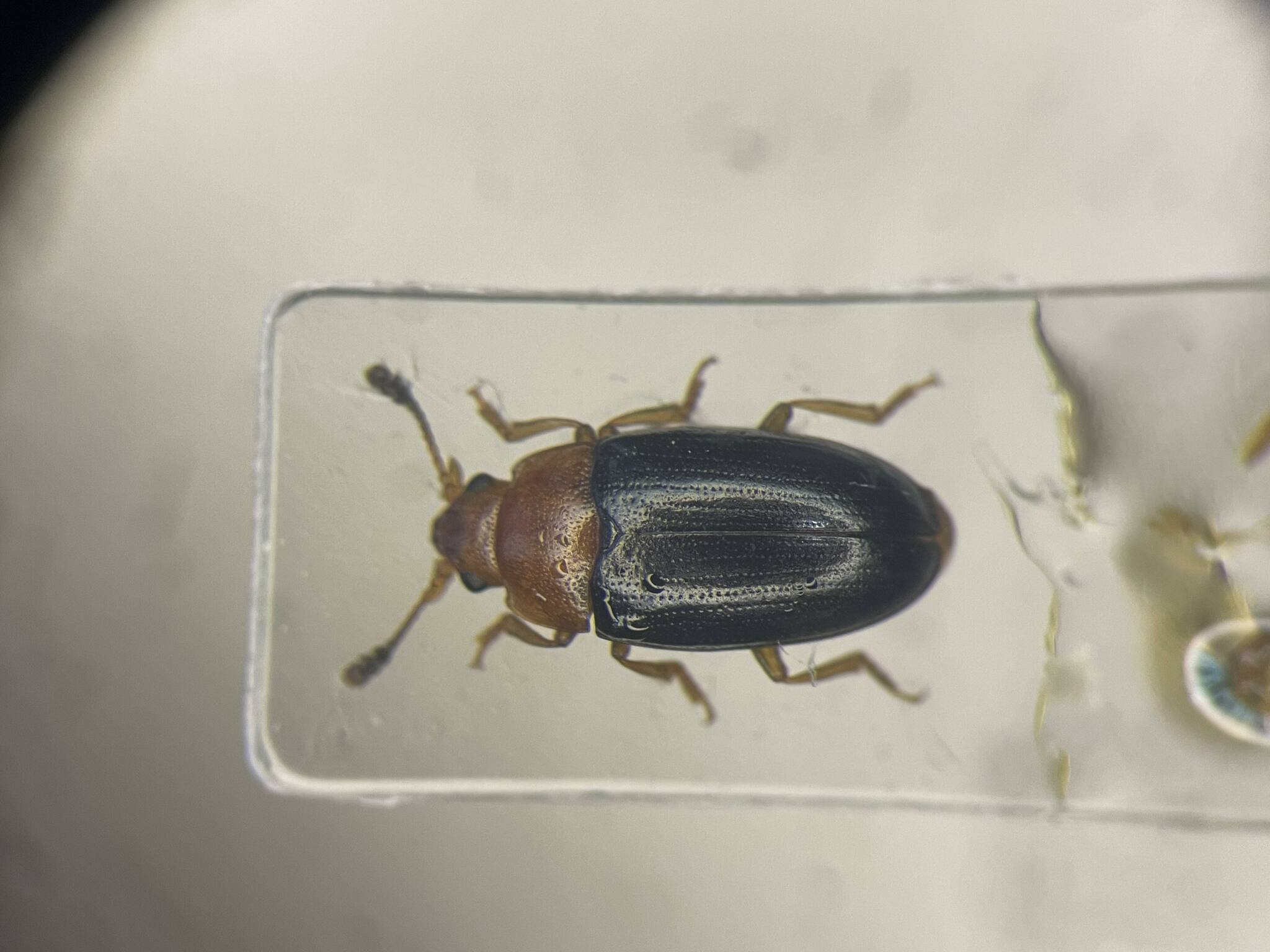
Adult specimen of T.thoracica – note the black scutellum and less shiny elytra covered all over in larger and smaller punctuations (click to magnify)

Adults of this beetle are about 3.3-5.4 mm long and 1.6-2.9 mm wide. Their elongated body has smoothly curving sides and strongly shiny elytra. Like in many of their relatives, head and pronotum are reddish-orange, while the elytra are black. The scutellum is orange-yellow, lighter than the pronotum if anything, providing an easy distinguishing trait against T.thoracica (albeit only obvious with a magnifying glass). As usual for the members of the "breast-plated" species complex, T.frosti has orange legs and antenna bases and lacks a conspicuous margin to the forehead sides, which also form a well-rounded obtuse angle towards the mouth. The "stems" of its antennae are reddish-orange up to segment 7, with segment 8 dark chestnut brown, and the black segments 9-11 forming elongated "clubs".

It can be distinguished from most other Triplax – even very close relatives – by having an all-orange underside, no distinct margin at the base of the elytra, and conspicuously expanded maxillary palps; T.thoracica is identical in these regards, but apart from the dark scutellum color differs in having the spaces between the lengthwise lines of large punctures on the elytra strewn with smaller punctures all the way from the elytra base (instead of smooth and unpunctuated at the base as in T.frosti). The male genitalia are also clearly different.

Head
The head has small compound eyes with tiny ommatidia, indicating a diurnal or crepuscular lifestyle, but with overall rather little reliance on eyesight. Male T.frosti adults possess file-like structures at the sides of the neck attachment, which, when the beetle wiggles its head, rub against the chitin and produce a squeaking sound; these structures are developed similarly to those of, e.g., Dacne pubescens, and are absent in T.frosti females. The ocular striae end above the antenna attachments; the epistome bulges slightly outward towards the compound eyes at the sides. Unlike in T.macra and its relatives, the epistome has a faint and broken rather than a clearly discernible margin along the sides and tip, and a blunt and widely curved angle between the sides and the tip; the latter is fairly narrow, almost straight, and has a slight concavity in the center. The "cheek" lobes below the compound eyes are smallish, with the side edge clearly diverging to the rear, and are almost straight towards the tip. The antenna length is about two-thirds of the pronotal base width, with antenna segment 3 shorter than the segments 4 and 5 together. The "stem" of the antenna has sparse short silvery bristles, and bears a "clubbed" antenna tip which consists of the last three segments (9-11) and is more than twice as long as it is wide.

As for the mouthparts, the galea and lacinia of the maxilla resemble those of the related genus Tritoma, the galea being almost triangular, with a tip carrying sparse bristles at the outer side and a dense pack of bristles on the inner side. The lacinia is also covered in dense bristles, and – unlike in Tritoma – at the tip has two small black incurved teeth, set so closely together that they may appear as a single tooth. The maxillary palps curve inwards and have a first segment that is at least as long as segments 2 and 3 together. Their end segment is somewhat triangular, abruptly cut-off, and more than three times as wide as it is long. Its tip carries a small brush, which consists of a single row of microscopic fleshy finger-like cylinders, which on their sides have many small bristles. The labium has a mentum that is fairly narrow, angular and moderately sized, with almost parallel sides; however, between individuals, size and shape of the mentum are somewhat variable. The labial palps end in a widened hatchet-shaped segment, which is sparsely covered in short bristles, with a longer strong bristle at the outer side. At its tip, it has a tiny brush, much smaller than that at the end of the maxillary palps, and composed of a single row of short smooth nubs.

Body, wings and legs
The prothorax is almost as wide at the base as the wings at their widest point. The pronotum is trapezoid-shaped, with the rear edge around two-thirds again as long as the forward edge; its sides strongly curve towards the front. A thin margin runs around the sides and rear of the pronotum, but is absent from the front between the compound eyes. In each corner of the pronotum, there is a sizeable navel-shaped pore, and the pronotum is densely covered in large punctuations which are less than their diameter apart; in the rear corners, there is a row of even larger and strongly impressed punctures, followed towards the center of the pronotum by an area of equally large but weaker-impressed punctures. The prosternum and metasternum lack clearly visible lengthwise lines from the center margin of the leg attachments to the rear edge of the prosternum. On the base of the abdomen, lines between the hindleg attachments run along the tip of the abdomen, which protrudes as a narrow bent process between the hindleg attachments.

The scutellum is bluntly pentagonal to almost heart-shaped. The elytra lack a distinct margin at the base; they are ornamented with regular lines of mid-sized punctuations, with the space between these lines highly shiny and lacking any punctures or other visible ornamentation. Occasionally, specimens are found whose elytra seem to resemble T.thoracica, but this is just a minor physical anomaly caused by twisting of the punctured stripes. The attachments of each leg pair are set narrowly together. The tibiae are slightly widened towards the tip (often, but not reliably, slightly wider in males) except on the barely widened forelegs, and have a bluntly rounded upper/outer edge. Segment 4 of the tarsi is reduced, attached to the upper centerside of segment 3, and firmly joined to the base segment 5.

The aedeagus of the male genitalia has narrow tegminal arms, down- and forward-curving dorsal struts of the tegmen, and lateral lobes which attach to the tip of the basal piece. The median lobe is slightly curved, with a tipwards membrane at the back surrounding a hole in the center. The internal sac has two long lengthwise sclerotized stripes at the forward back, and within the median lobe a crosswise sclerotized patch which is trough-shaped and black when seen from below. Where the median lobe meets the median strut, at the rear end of the sclerotized stripes the two additional small black curved patches present in T.thoracica are lacking. Like in other members of its species complex, a conspicuous black muscle attachment is located at the forward end of the internal sac. In T.frosti it has a typical "scoop" shape, with a forward-pointing "shovel blade" and a concavity on the back, very different from the V-shaped structure seen in T.thoracica. The ejaculatory duct enters the internal sac at the rear of the large black muscle attachment, and tapers towards the tip. Within the internal sac it may be straight, but more often it forms a short spiral in the region of the median lobe. The female genitalia are fairly generic, resembling those of other Erotylidae such as Megalodacne, which within the pleasing fungus beetle family is not particularly closely related to Triplax. But while they are proportionally smaller in width compared to the larger-bodied Megalodacne (just like in all Triplax) except for the larger basal segments of the valvifers and the paraprocts, almost all parts are drastically shortened in length compared to e.g. Triplax macra. However, the styli are sized as in most other Triplax species, and the proctigeral lobe is comparatively oversized, extending up to the valvifer tips. Tergite 8 except for being longer and narrower resembles that of Haematochiton in having strongly sclerotized lines along the sides, and in the centerline near the tip a deep but narrow membranous indentation. As typical for its species complex, T.frosti has the stabilizing straps at the rearward end of the eighth tergite and sternite conspicuously shortened.

== Systematics ==
This species is held to be one of the "breast-plated" pleasing fungus beetles of the Triplax thoracica cryptic species complex. This large group, other than putative sister species T.thoracica and T.frosti, also includes T.californica, T.cuneata, T.dissimulator, T.errans, T.flavicollis, T.lacensis, T.mesosternalis, T.microgaster, T.puncticeps and T.wehrlei.

However, an Erotylidae COI phylogeny including 9 Triplax species failed to resolve any well-supported relationships between these; instead, Triplax formed a paraphyletic and probably artefactual assemblage with the closely related Aporotritoma pulchra, Tritoma bipustulata and Ischyrus quadripunctatus, as well as the entire Erotylinae (or Erotylini if Triplax is included in Erotylidae) which resolved as sister to Aporotritima/Tritoma. The study did not aim at understanding relationships among Triplax, but to provide a framework of higher-level Erotylidae lineages; misrooting, long branch attraction or similar errors are likely to have confounded the phylogeny at the species level.

The three members of the proposed "breast-plated" complex included in the study formed a supposed "clade" with some Eurasian relatives (and I.quadripunctatus) mixed in between; this "clade" was extremely badly resolved. Unexpectedly, T.frosti resolved as closer to the Eurasian T.scutellaris than to T.thoracica, but with low support. In fact, the placement of T.thoracica had the lowest support in the entire phylogeny, being less than one-tenth as likely to be correct as the monophyly of the commonly accepted Erotylidae subfamilies or tribes.

== Distribution and ecology ==
T.frosti is found in the USA and Canada from Nova Scotia to Virginia, west at least to Manitoba and Nebraska, and from there more sparsely northwest to British Columbia. Unlike most of its relatives, it avoids subtropical climates, ranging south only to Virginia and perhaps Tennessee. Altogether, though it is by no means rare, its range is not well understood; it appears to occur in an arc running southeast to west along the former massive prehistoric Lake Agassiz-Ojibway.

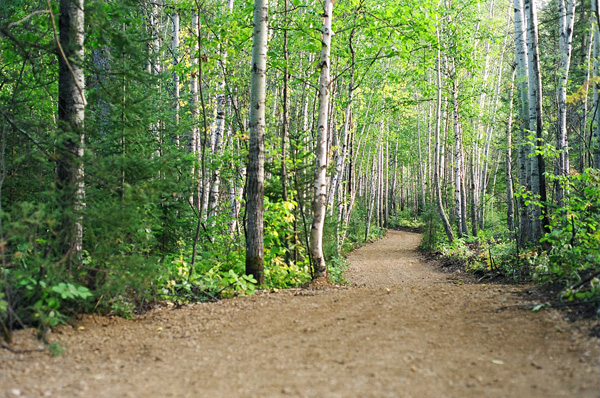
Birch woodland in Fort McMurray, Alberta, near the northern limit of T.frosti

The northernmost limits are at least Upper Canard, Nova Scotia, Kouchibouguac National Park in New Brunswick, Duparquet, Quebec, Malachi, Ontario, Teulon, Manitoba, Redfield, Saskatchewan, and Edwand and Fort McMurray in Alberta. In the west, it ranges at least to Grand Forks, North Dakota (where it occurs on the university campus) and Sioux County, Nebraska. From its southern limit, there are few records; it occurs at least to Pennington Gap, Virginia, but its limits due west are essentially conjectural.

This beetle is most rarely encountered outside late May to mid-September; most often, it is seen from June to early August. Found in woodlands as typical for Triplax, it has been associated with particular tree species such as birch (Betula), aspen and other poplars (Populus), and willow (Salix); these are relevant to T.frosti not as the specific tree species in and by themselves, but as generic hideouts – and most of all as the hosts of the fungi on which this beetle feeds. In general, T.frosti has a strong preference for oyster mushrooms (Pleurotus; Agaricales: Pleurotaceae) as larvae and adults; usually, it is found on the common oyster mushroom (Pleurotus ostreatus). The record from Upper Canard is unusual, with the beetles found "in pears on [the] ground"; as the date was April 30, the pears were probably rotten and whether the beetles ate the fruit pulp rather than fungi growing on it (or simply had been hiding in the fruit in winter) is questionable. Unlike most other pleasing fungus beetles, where each species keeps to itself, T.frosti is more sociable and has, for example, been found together with T. dissimulator. Even more frequently, it associates with one of its presumed closest relatives, T. thoracica; the differently-built genitalia seem to effectively prevent interbreeding of these two extremely similar species.
