= Triplax californica =

Scientific classification
- Kingdom: Animalia
- Phylum: Arthropoda
- Clade: Pancrustacea
- Class: Insecta
- Order: Coleoptera
- Suborder: Polyphaga
- Infraorder: Cucujiformia
- Family: Erotylidae
- Genus: Triplax
- Species: T. californica

Binomial name
- Triplax californica LeConte, 1854

Synonyms
- Triplax antica LeConte, 1861; Triplax mormonalis Casey, 1916

Species of beetle

Triplax californica is a North American species of small pleasing fungus beetle (family Erotylidae). It is placed in subfamily Tritominae (formerly Triplacinae), or – in taxonomic arrangements that prefer a more comprehensive subfamily Erotylinae – in tribe Tritomini of the Erotylinae.

This species is probably one of the "breast-plated" pleasing fungus beetles of the Triplax thoracica cryptic species complex. This large group, other than T.thoracica and T.californica, also includes T.cuneata, T.dissimulator, T.errans, T.flavicollis, T.frosti, T.lacensis, T.mesosternalis, T.microgaster, T.puncticeps and T.wehrlei.

At the end of the 20th century, the supposedly distinct species Triplax antica was merged into T.californica as subspecies after comprehensive studies. They are well on their way to evolve into separate species – their male genitalia have some minor differences, and most of the population can be unequivocally assigned to one subspecies or the other. However, a zone of intermediate phenotypes exists, where a constant gene flow is upheld between antica and californica; distinct species of Triplax, on the other hand, produce at most very few intermediate individuals wherever they occur together, and usually none at all.

== Description ==
Adults of this beetle are about 2.7-5.1 mm long and 1.3-2.4 mm wide. Their elongated body has smoothly curving sides, and bears barely visible thin and short pale hairs. Their coloration is more washed-out and dusky than most of their crisply orange-and-black relatives. Southwestern populations (T.c.californica) resemble their congeners in coloration, with a reddish head and prothorax and usually also a red hue on the scutellum and the base of the elytra, which are otherwise black and not very shiny. As usual for the members of the "breast-plated" species complex, T.californica has orange legs and antenna bases; beyond the first two segments, the antennae are dark red, with a black "club" at the end. The coxae of the middle and hind legs, the base of the prosternum, the mesopleural sternites and the tip of the abdomen are dark reddish-brown. The northeastern populations (T.c.antica) are usually almost entirely dusky brownish-black with light reddish-brown head and legs. The red wash to the elytra bases is comparatively more pronounced than in T.c.californica, and may extend halfway to the wingtip. In the zone of intergradation, the coloration of the prothorax is variable, most conspicuously so on the pronotum which individually varies between dark brown and dark red.

As usual for the members of the "breast-plated" species complex, T.californica has no conspicuous margin to the forehead sides, which also form a well-rounded obtuse angle at the tip. Apart from its coloration, it can be distinguished from most other Triplax – even very close relatives – by the comparatively huge pores at the angles of the pronotum. In the species complex, it stands somewhat apart – in some "breast-plated" Triplax species, all adults can produce chirping noises, while in others only the males can. T.californica females are incapable of chirping, but unlike the females of the latter group they still retain the sound-producing organs in a vestigial form.

=== Head ===
The head has small compound eyes with tiny ommatidia, indicating a diurnal or crepuscular lifestyle, but with overall rather little reliance on eyesight; it is densely sprinkled with mid-sized punctures, which on the sides of the head are so dense as to cover almost the entire surface in T.c.californica; in T.c.antiqua the head punctures are a bit smaller and scattered less densely. Male T.californica adults possess file-like structures at the sides of the neck attachment, which, when the beetle wiggles its head, rub against the chitin and produce a squeaking sound; these structures are developed similarly to those of, e.g., Dacne pubescens, and in T.californica females are reduced to small non-functional nubs. The ocular striae end above the antenna attachments; the epistome has a well-rounded transition between the straight sides and the tip, the latter being almost straight with a slight concavity in the center; along the sides, there is a barely visible margin, while the tip is unmargined. The "cheek" lobes below the compound eyes are fairly long, with rounded side edges which diverge to the rear. The antenna length is about two-thirds of the pronotal base width, with antenna segment 3 shorter than the segments 4 and 5 together. The "stem" of the antenna has sparse short silvery bristles and bears a "clubbed" antenna tip, which consists of the last three segments (9-11) and is more than twice as long as it is wide.

As for the mouthparts, the galea and lacinia of the maxilla resemble those of the related genus Tritoma, the galea being almost triangular, with a tip carrying sparse bristles at the outer side and a dense pack of bristles on the inner side. The lacinia is also covered in dense bristles, and – unlike in Tritoma – at the tip has two small black incurved teeth, set so closely together that they may appear as a single tooth. The maxillary palps curve inwards and have a first segment that is at least as long as segments 2 and 3 together. Their end segment is somewhat triangular, abruptly cut-off, and a bit more than twice as wide as it is long. Its tip carries a small brush, which consists of a single row of microscopic fleshy finger-like cylinders, which on their sides have many small bristles. The labium has a mentum that is fairly narrow, angular and comparatively long; however, between individuals, size and shape of the mentum are somewhat variable. The labial palps end in a widened hatchet-shaped segment, which is sparsely covered in short bristles, with a longer strong bristle at the outer side. At its tip, it has a tiny brush, much smaller than that at the end of the maxillary palps, and composed of a single row of short smooth nubs.

=== Body, wings and legs ===
The prothorax is almost as wide at the base as the wings at their widest point. The pronotum is trapezoid-shaped, with the rear edge around two-thirds again as long as the forward edge; its sides strongly curve towards the front. A thin margin runs around the sides and rear of the pronotum, but is absent from the front between the compound eyes. In each corner of the pronotum, there is a navel-shaped pore of comparatively huge size, and the pronotum is densely in large punctuations, which become even larger and denser towards the sides, where they are separated by less than their diameter. The prosternum and metasternum lack clearly visible lengthwise lines from the center margin of the leg attachments to the rear edge of the prosternum. On the base of the abdomen, lines between the hindleg attachments run along the tip of the abdomen, which protrudes as a narrow bent process between the hindleg attachments.

The scutellum is bluntly pentagonal, almost heart-shaped. The elytra lack a distinct margin at the base; they are ornamented with regular lines of small punctuations, and a dense irregular scattering of similar-sized punctures in the spaces between these lines, where the surface is also finely fissured – more clearly so in T.c.californica than in T.c.antiqua – causing the elytra to be rather matte. The attachments of each leg pair are set narrowly together. The tibiae are slightly widened towards the tip (often, but not reliably, slightly wider in males) except on the barely widened forelegs, and have a bluntly rounded upper/outer edge. Segment 4 of the tarsi is reduced, attached to the upper centerside of segment 3, and firmly joined to the base segment 5.

The aedeagus of the male genitalia has narrow tegminal arms, down- and forward-curving dorsal struts of the tegmen, and lateral lobes which attach to the tip of the basal piece. The median lobe is slightly curved, with a tipwards membrane at the back surrounding a hole in the center. The large internal sac extends in front of the median lobe about as far as the median strut does; it has very long, narrow, but somewhat indistinct sclerotized stripes at the forward back, which lack dark markings near their rear end within the median lobe. Like in other members of its species complex, a black muscle attachment is located at the forward end of the internal sac; in T.californica it is comparatively small and varies slightly in shape between the two subspecies. The enclosed ejaculatory duct has a wing-like expansion – usually larger in T.c.californica than in T.c.antiqua – on each side near its forward end; to the rear it tapers and is more or less spiralling. In some situations – probably after copulation – the internal sac expands to several times its normal diameter, and the ejaculatory duct coils up to a spiral. The female genitalia are fairly generic, resembling those of other Erotylidae such as Megalodacne, which within the pleasing fungus beetle family is not particularly closely related to Triplax. But while they are proportionally smaller in width compared to the larger-bodied Megalodacne (just like in all Triplax) except for the larger basal segments of the valvifers and the paraprocts, almost all parts are drastically shortened in length compared to e.g. Triplax macra. However, the styli are sized as in most other Triplax species, and the proctigeral lobe is comparatively oversized, extending up to the valvifer tips. Tergite 8 except for being longer and narrower resembles that of Haematochiton in having strongly sclerotized lines along the sides, and in the centerline near the tip a deep but narrow membranous indentation. As typical for its species complex, T.thoracica has the stabilizing straps at the rearward end of the eighth tergite and sternite conspicuously shortened.

== Distribution and subspecies ==
T.californica is almost endemic to the USA west of the Rocky Mountains. However, its range extends northwards into southern British Columbia (Canada), southwards into northernmost Mexico, and east along the US-Canadian border across the Rocky Mountains to southern Saskatchewan and Nebraska (though its presence in the Plains States is sparse).

Two different phenotypes exist within T.californica adults, a northeastern dusky and a southwestern brighter and clearly bicolored one. As noted above, they were once ranked as distinct species, but intergrade over a long but fairly narrow stretch across the western Rocky Mountains (where the species does not seem common, however). The bulk of the populations are well distinct, and they are thus ranked as subspecies today:

- Triplax californica antica LeConte, 1861 – southeastern British Columbia south to eastern Washington, Oregon, Nevada and Utah, eastwards sparsely to Saskatchewan, Nebraska, Colorado and New Mexico.
- Triplax californica californica LeConte, 1854 – California and into surrounding US States, north to southwestern British Columbia; barely extends into Mexico in the Colorado River Delta region south of California-Arizona border.

To the east, records become scarce; in the northeast, T.c.antiqua ranges at least to Redfield, Saskatchewan, at the northern end of the Great Plains just a few dozen miles south of the Aspen parkland belt. Further south it has been found at Denver, Colorado; furthermore, in the Henry Ulke collection at CMNH, there is a single T.c.antiqua labeled "Neb." (for Nebraska), but its exact collection locality is not known.

The zone of intergradation runs from central southern British Columbia south-southeastwards through central Washington, Oregon and western Nevada; rarely, antiqua-type individuals are encountered in eastern California. At Creston and Merritt in British Columbia, both antiqua- and californica-type specimens have been collected, whereas in the Vancouver region only the latter were found. In Washington State, both phenotypes occur at least between College Place and Almota; in the Seattle area only californica-type beetles are found. In Oregon, both were collected at Hood River, while in Dayton, Corvallis and Jackson County, only californica-types were found. In Nevada, the zone of intergradation runs at least between Fallon and Reno, i.e. in the western part of the state; it thus probably extends slightly into California.

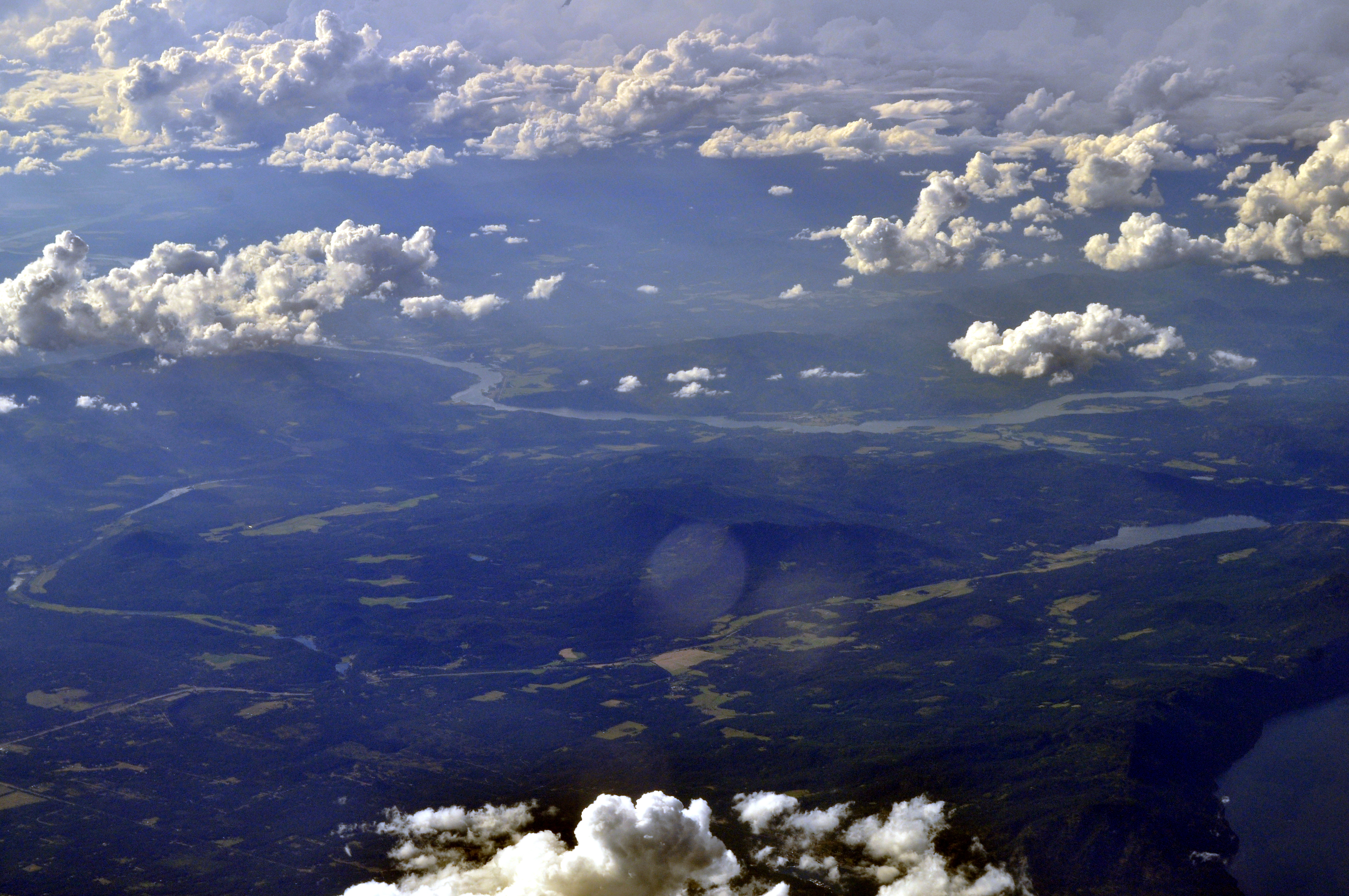
Aerial view of the Pend Oreille River west of Sandpoint, Idaho – the type locality of T.c.antiqua is almost exactly at the center of the photo

The type specimen of californica (LeConte collection 6773 in the MCZ), an adult of undetermined sex, was taken at San Jose, California, south of the San Francisco Bay. There is also a T.c.californica specimen labeled "Penn.", seemingly suggesting a record from Pennsylvania, but this is erroneous. The antiqua type specimen, likewise an unsexed adult, is number 6772 in the MCZ LeConte collection. It was collected by a Mr. Gibbs and has a round dark-blue label, which in LeConte's system denoted specimens from "Oregon [et]c." – at that time not yet a rigorously delimited area. In his description, LeConte gives the type locality as "Sinyak water depot", which is a misunderstanding of Sin-na-ac-qua-teen (Ktunaxa: "The place where the river narrows"), a Idaho Ksanka trade post and ferry on the south bank of the Pend Oreille River, opposite today's Laclede, Idaho. This place was known to the settlers as "Seneagnooteen" or "Sinyakwateeh Depot"; it was the first county seat of the former Kootenai County and today is the settlement of Sawyer in Bonner County.

T.californica occurs from the seashore to considerable altitudes. Gunnison County, Colorado, T.c.antiqua was recorded at 7,500 feet (2,300 m), and T.c.californica was found in Atwell Mill Grove at 6,600 feet (2,000 m) AMSL.

== Ecology ==
T.c.antiqua is mostly active between late May to late August, but most common in June/July. On the Washington-Oregon border south of College Place, Washington, it was found as early as March 20, and at Webb, Idaho, it was collected on March 28. At Fallon, Nevada, individuals of antiqua- and californica-phenotypes were found on a December 17. T.c.californica can occasionally be found year-round in the south of its range; in Pinehurst in Contra Costa County, California, it was collected on a January 3, and in San Francisco on a December 20.

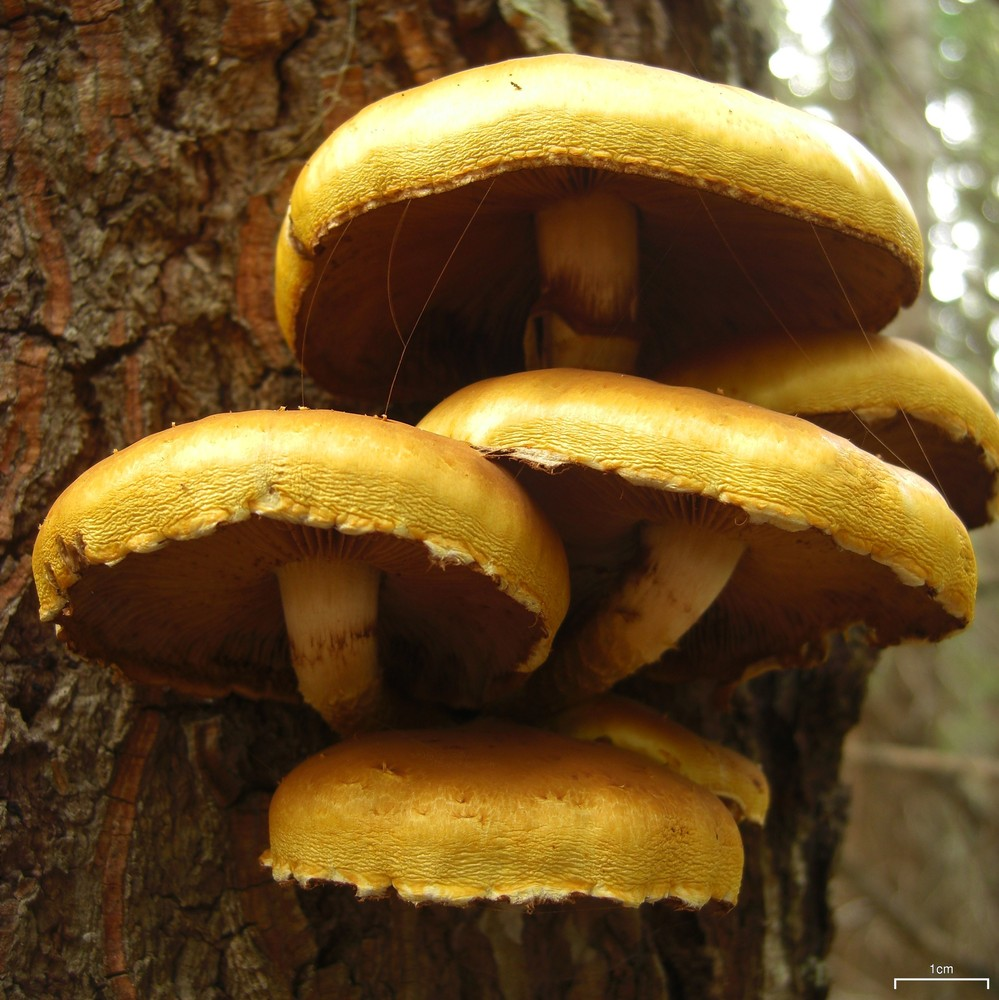
Golden pholiota is a suspected food of adult T.californica, but probably not of its larvae (Cabinet Mountains, Montana)

This beetle eats Agaricomycetes tree fungi as larva and adults. Like its closest relatives, its preferred food is oyster mushrooms (Pleurotus; Agaricales: Pleurotaceae) such as the common Pleurotus ostreatus. But its food spectrum seems to be wider than in some other "breast-plated" pleasing fungus beetles: Large numbers of adults – reproducing or recently hatched? – were found on other Agaricales fungi such as golden pholiota (Pholiota aurivella, Strophariaceae) and an undetermined Lentinellus (Auriscalpiaceae). In addition, a small number of individuals has been recorded from an unspecified "Polyporus" – i.e. some undeterminable member of family Polyporaceae of the Polyporales ("true" shelf fungi).

Other records associate this species with trees, but these are probably only sought out for the shelter they provide and the fungi they host; in any case, T.californica of both phenotypes having been found on the same black cottonwood (Populus trichocarpa) at Creston, British Columbia. At Davis, California, T.c.californica was found on alfalfa (Medicago sativa) on February 23, 1950 – one of the few records that associate Erotylidae with flowers –, and at Long Beach, California it was collected from unidentified lichens. T.c.antiqua was found in grassland at Farmington, Utah.
