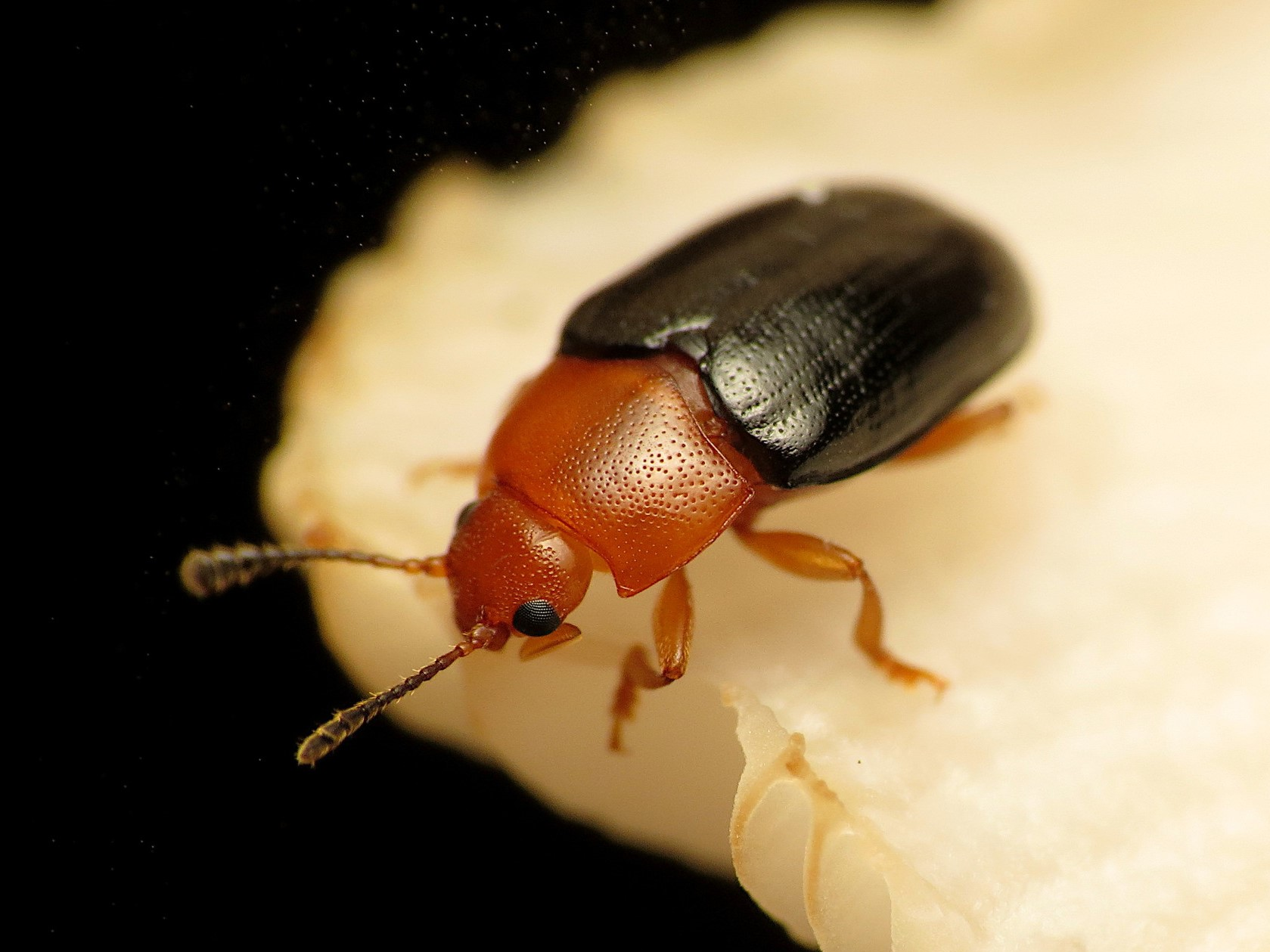
- Adult in Rock Creek Park, Washington DC, USA

Scientific classification
- Kingdom: Animalia
- Phylum: Arthropoda
- Clade: Pancrustacea
- Class: Insecta
- Order: Coleoptera
- Suborder: Polyphaga
- Infraorder: Cucujiformia
- Family: Erotylidae
- Genus: Triplax
- Species: T. thoracica

Binomial name
- Triplax thoracica Say, 1825

Synonyms
- Triplax latiuscula Casey, 1916; Triplax melanoptera Lacordaire, 1842; Triplax thoracica antennata Casey, 1916; Triplax thoracica brevicollis Casey, 1916; Triplax thoracica convergens Casey, 1916; Triplax thoracica obliqua Casey, 1916; Tritoma thoracica (Say, 1825)

= Triplax thoracica =

Species of beetle

Triplax thoracica, the breast-plated triplax or breast-plated pleasing fungus beetle, is a North American species of small pleasing fungus beetle (family Erotylidae). It is placed in subfamily Tritominae (formerly Triplacinae), or – in taxonomic arrangements that prefer a more comprehensive subfamily Erotylinae – in tribe Tritomini of the Erotylinae.

It is suspected to form a large cryptic species complex with its relatives T.californica, T.cuneata, T.dissimulator, T.errans, T.flavicollis, T.frosti, T.lacensis, T.mesosternalis, T.microgaster, T.puncticeps and T.wehrlei (but see below).

== Description ==
Adults of this beetle are about 3-5.7 mm long and 1.5-2.9 mm wide. Their elongated body has smoothly curving sides; it is somewhat shiny and mostly bare, with conspicuous hair only on the abdomen. Like in many of their relatives, head and pronotum are reddish-orange, while the elytra are black. The scutellum is dark brown, appearing black like the elytra except from up close. As usual for the members of the "breast-plated" species complex, T.thoracica has orange legs and antenna bases and lacks a conspicuous margin to the forehead sides, which also form a well-rounded obtuse angle towards the mouth; the "stems" of its antennae become gradually darker towards the black antenna "clubs".

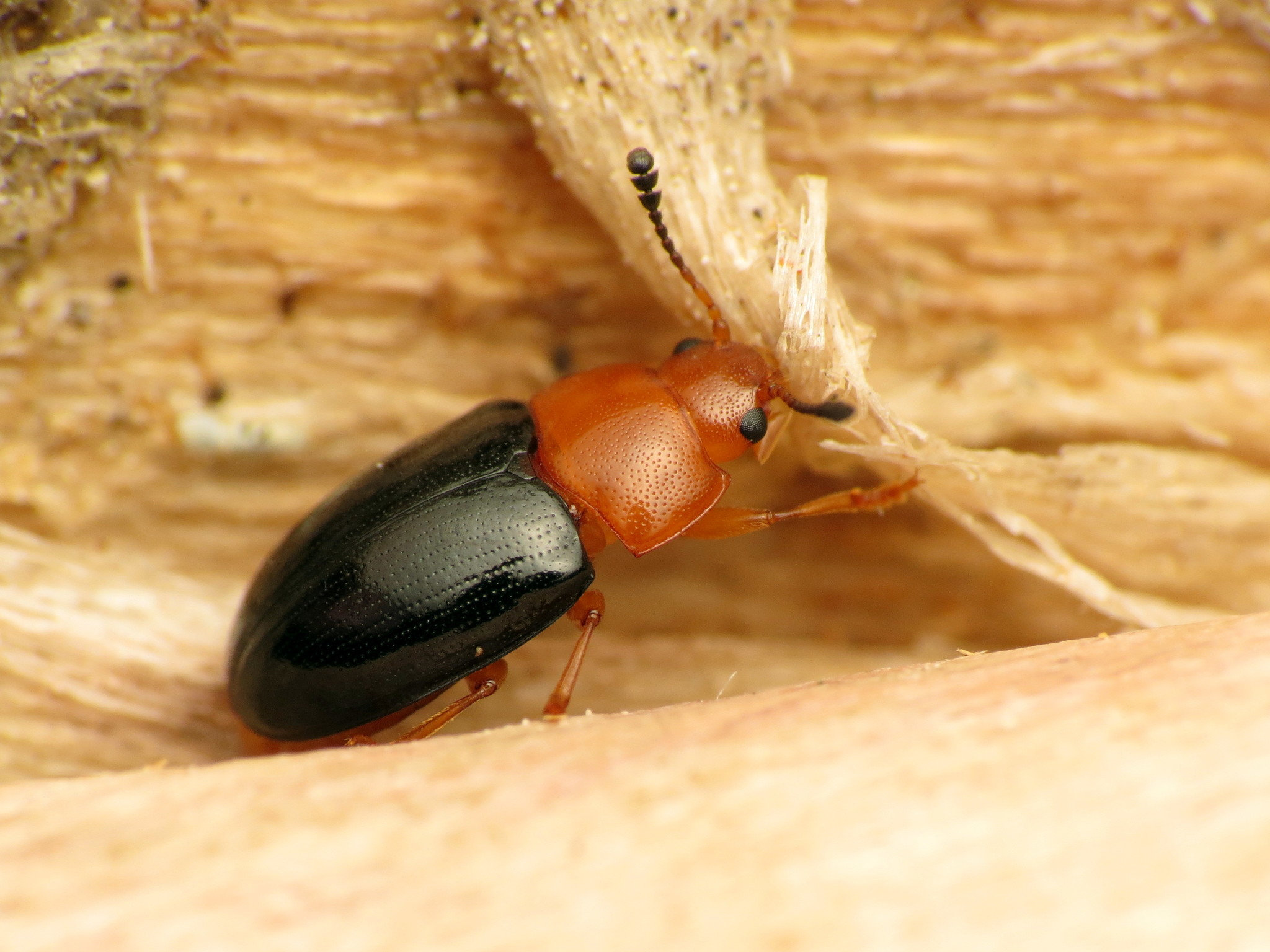
Diagnostic traits (click image to magnify): 1. Orange antenna bases; 2. Orange thorax underside; 3. Dark scutellum; 4. Two sizes of punctures on elytra bases

It can be distinguished from most other Triplax – even very close relatives – by having an all-orange underside, no distinct margin at the base of the elytra, and strongly expanded maxillary palps; T.frosti is identical in these regards, but T.thoracica differs from that species by having the spaces between the lengthwise lines of large punctures on the elytra strewn with smaller punctures throughout (instead of smooth at the elytra base as in T.frosti), and a scutellum that is a similar blackish color as the elytra, not orange-yellow as the pronotum as it is in T.frosti. The male genitalia are also clearly different. While Triplax adults generally are very variable in size, T.thoracica takes individual variation to an extreme – in addition to the usual variation in length, individuals may be notably stouter or slimmer than average, and there is a northeast-southwest cline in pronotum shape: while in the northeast of its range most individuals have a trapezoidal pronotum whose sides curve strongly from the rear to the front, most southwestern T.thoracica have a more rectangular pronotum with flaring sides and a pronounced outward curve also at the rear end. Originally described by Thomas Casey Jr. as distinct subspecies or even species, in the center of its range (e.g. St. Louis, Missouri) individuals with the entire range of narrow to widened pronota can be encountered together; thus, Casey's taxa are all synonymized and no subspecies are accepted in T.thoracica.

Head
The head has small compound eyes with tiny ommatidia, indicating a diurnal or crepuscular lifestyle, but with overall rather little reliance on eyesight; it is densely sprinkled with large punctures, which between the compound eyes almost cover the entire surface. Male T.thoracica adults possess file-like structures at the sides of the neck attachment, which, when the beetle wiggles its head, rub against the chitin and produce a squeaking sound; these structures are developed similarly to those of, e.g., Dacne pubescens, and are absent in T.thoracica females. The ocular striae end above the antenna attachments, around which the epistome forms a slight curve. The epistome, unlike in T.macra and its relatives, lacks a margin and has a blunt and rounded angle between the sides and the tip; the latter is almost straight, with a slight concavity in the center. The "cheek" lobes below the compound eyes are small and when seen from below do not reach the eyes. The antenna length is 75% of the pronotal base width, with antenna segment 3 shorter than the segments 4 and 5 together. The "stem" of the antenna has sparse short silvery bristles and bears a "clubbed" antenna tip, which consists of the last three segments (9-11) and is more than twice as long as it is wide.

As for the mouthparts, the galea and lacinia of the maxilla resemble those of the related genus Tritoma, the galea being almost triangular, with a tip carrying sparse bristles at the outer side and a dense pack of bristles on the inner side. The lacinia is also covered in dense bristles, and – unlike in Tritoma – at the tip has two small black incurved teeth, set so closely together that they may appear as a single tooth. The maxillary palps curve inwards and have a first segment that is at least as long as segments 2 and 3 together. Their end segment is somewhat triangular, abruptly cut-off, and more than three times as wide as it is long. Its tip carries a small brush, which consists of a single row of microscopic fleshy finger-like cylinders, which on their sides have many small bristles. The labium has a mentum that is fairly narrow, angular and moderately sized, with almost parallel sides; however, between individuals, size and shape of the mentum are somewhat variable. The labial palps end in a widened hatchet-shaped segment, which is sparsely covered in short bristles, with a longer strong bristle at the outer side. At its tip, it has a tiny brush, much smaller than that at the end of the maxillary palps, and composed of a single row of short smooth nubs.

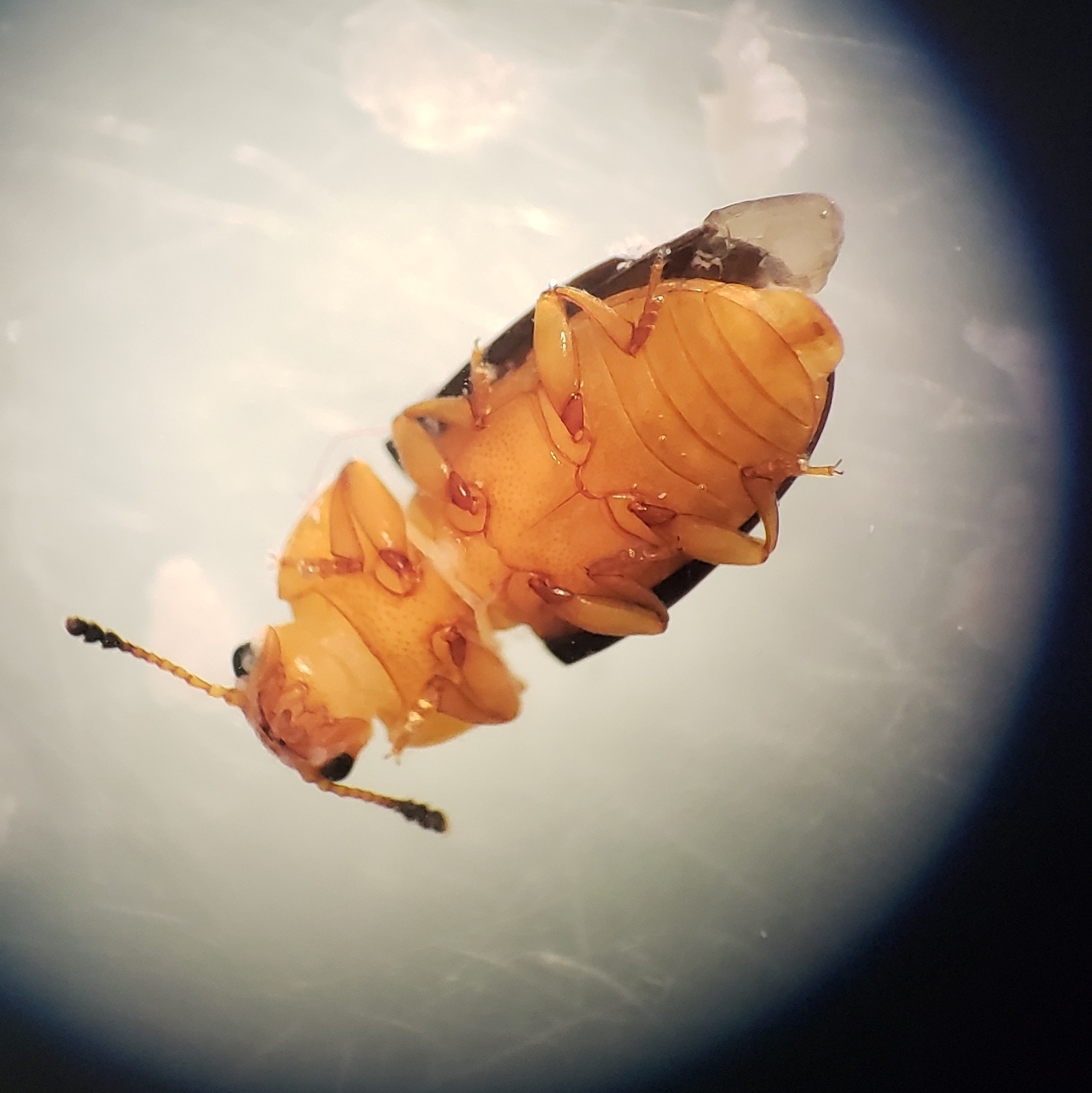
From below, T.thoracica is indistinguishable from its close relative T.frosti (shown here), but the all-orange underside can rule out some other relatives

Body, wings and legs
The prothorax is almost as wide at the base as the wings at their widest point. The pronotum is trapezoid-shaped, with the rear edge around two-thirds again as long as the forward edge; its sides strongly curve at least in front, and in individuals with widened pronotum also in the rear. A thin margin runs around the sides and rear of the pronotum, but is absent from the front between the compound eyes. In each corner of the pronotum, there is a sizeable navel-shaped pore, and the pronotum is covered in moderately-sized punctuations; in the rear corners, there is a row of larger punctures, followed towards the center of the pronotum by an area of smaller punctures. The prosternum and metasternum lack clearly visible lengthwise lines from the center margin of the leg attachments to the rear edge of the prosternum. On the base of the abdomen, lines between the hindleg attachments run along the tip of the abdomen, which protrudes as a narrow bent process between the hindleg attachments.

The scutellum is bluntly pentagonal to almost heart-shaped. The elytra lack a distinct margin at the base; they are ornamented with regular lines of mid-sized punctuations, and smaller (half the diameter) but strongly impressed punctures in staggered rows in between these lines. The attachments of each leg pair are set narrowly together. The tibiae are slightly widened towards the tip (often, but not reliably, slightly wider in males) except on the barely widened forelegs, and have a bluntly rounded upper/outer edge. Segment 4 of the tarsi is reduced, attached to the upper centerside of segment 3, and firmly joined to the base segment 5.

The aedeagus of the male genitalia has narrow tegminal arms, down- and forward-curving dorsal struts of the tegmen, and lateral lobes which attach to the tip of the basal piece. The median lobe is slightly curved, with a tipwards membrane at the back surrounding a hole in the center. Where the median lobe meets the median strut, at the rear end of the sclerotized stripes there are two small black patches, which in side view are curved. The internal sac has two long lengthwise sclerotized stripes at the rear back, and within the median lobe a crosswise sclerotized patch which is trough-shaped and black when seen from below. Like in other members of its species complex, a conspicuous black muscle attachment is located at the forward tip of the internal sac; in T.thoracica it is V-shaped. The ejaculatory duct tapers towards the tip; it is enclosed in the internal sac and may be straight, but more often it forms a short spiral in the region of the median lobe. The female genitalia are fairly generic, resembling those of other Erotylidae such as Megalodacne, which within the pleasing fungus beetle family is not particularly closely related to Triplax. But while they are proportionally smaller in width compared to the larger-bodied Megalodacne (just like in all Triplax) except for the larger basal segments of the valvifers and the paraprocts, almost all parts are drastically shortened in length compared to e.g. Triplax macra. However, the styli are sized as in most other Triplax species, and the proctigeral lobe is comparatively oversized, extending up to the valvifer tips. Tergite 8 except for being longer and narrower resembles that of Haematochiton in having strongly sclerotized lines along the sides, and in the centerline near the tip a deep but narrow membranous indentation. As typical for its species complex, T.thoracica has the stabilizing straps at the rearward end of the eighth tergite and sternite conspicuously shortened.

== Systematics ==
An Erotylidae COI phylogeny including 9 Triplax species failed to resolve any well-supported relationships between these, and did not recover the proposed T.thoracica species complex as monophyletic; instead, the Triplax formed a paraphyletic and probably artefactual assemblage with the closely related Aporotritoma pulchra, Tritoma bipustulata and Ischyrus quadripunctatus, as well as the entire Erotylinae (or Erotylini if Triplax is included in Erotylidae) which resolved as sister to Aporotritima/Tritoma. The study did not aim at understanding relationships among Triplax, but to provide a framework of higher-level Erotylidae lineages; misrooting, long branch attraction or similar errors are likely to have confounded the phylogeny at the species level.

The three members of the proposed "breast-plated" complex included in the study formed a supposed "clade" with some Eurasian relatives (and I.quadripunctatus) mixed in between; this "clade" was extremely badly resolved. Unexpectedly, T.frosti (which is highly similar to T.thoracica and traditionally believed to be its closest living relative) resolved as closer to the Eurasian T.scutellaris than to T.thoracica, but with low support. In fact, the placement of T.thoracica had the lowest support in the entire phylogeny, being less than one-tenth as likely to be correct as the monophyly of the commonly accepted Erotylidae subfamilies or tribes.

== Distribution ==
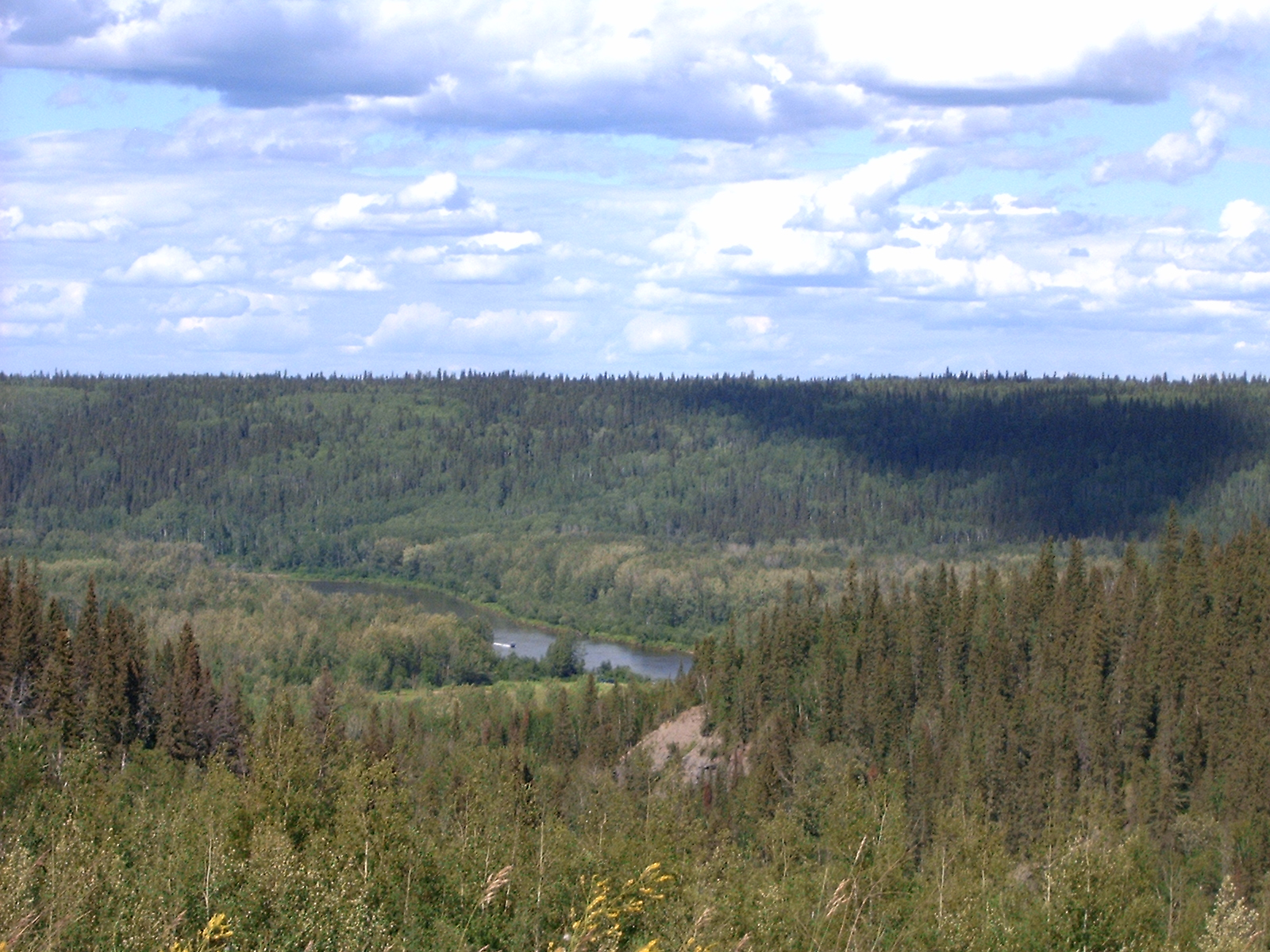
Taiga woodland near Fort McMurray, Alberta, close to the northern limit of T.thoracica

The type specimen, like many beetles collected by Thomas Say, is probably lost; its type locality was not given more precisely than "United States", referring to the U.S. territory around 1820. T.thoracica is widespread in North America east of the Rocky Mountains, from Prince Edward Island, New Brunswick and Nova Scotia to Alberta in the north, and south to the Gulf of Mexico coast and New Mexico. Its western limit runs through North Dakota, South Dakota, Nebraska and Colorado. Isolated records elsewhere – e.g. British Columbia or Central America – are probably due to misidentifications or individuals introduced by humans.

Its northern limit is north of the Great Lakes region; it occurs northeastwards at least to St. Patrick's, Prince Edward Island, Cumberland, Pictou and Guysborough counties in Nova Scotia, Bathurst, New Brunswick and Potton Springs, Quebec, and further west at least to Duparquet, Quebec, Nipigon, Ontario, the Criddle/Vane Homestead Provincial Park ("Aweme") in Manitoba, and Beaverlodge and Fort McMurray in Alberta where it even ranges into subarctic climates. Supposed records further north, such as from Lake Athabasca and north of the Peace River, or northwest such as near Kelowna, British Columbia, require confirmation. The western limit in the USA goes at least to Brush Creek in northern Custer County, Colorado, to and Santa Fe, New Mexico; in Montana and Wyoming its presence is little known. In the southwest, its range extends at least to San Antonio and Victoria in Texas, some 130-170 miles (210-280 km) northeast of the Mexican border.

== Ecology ==
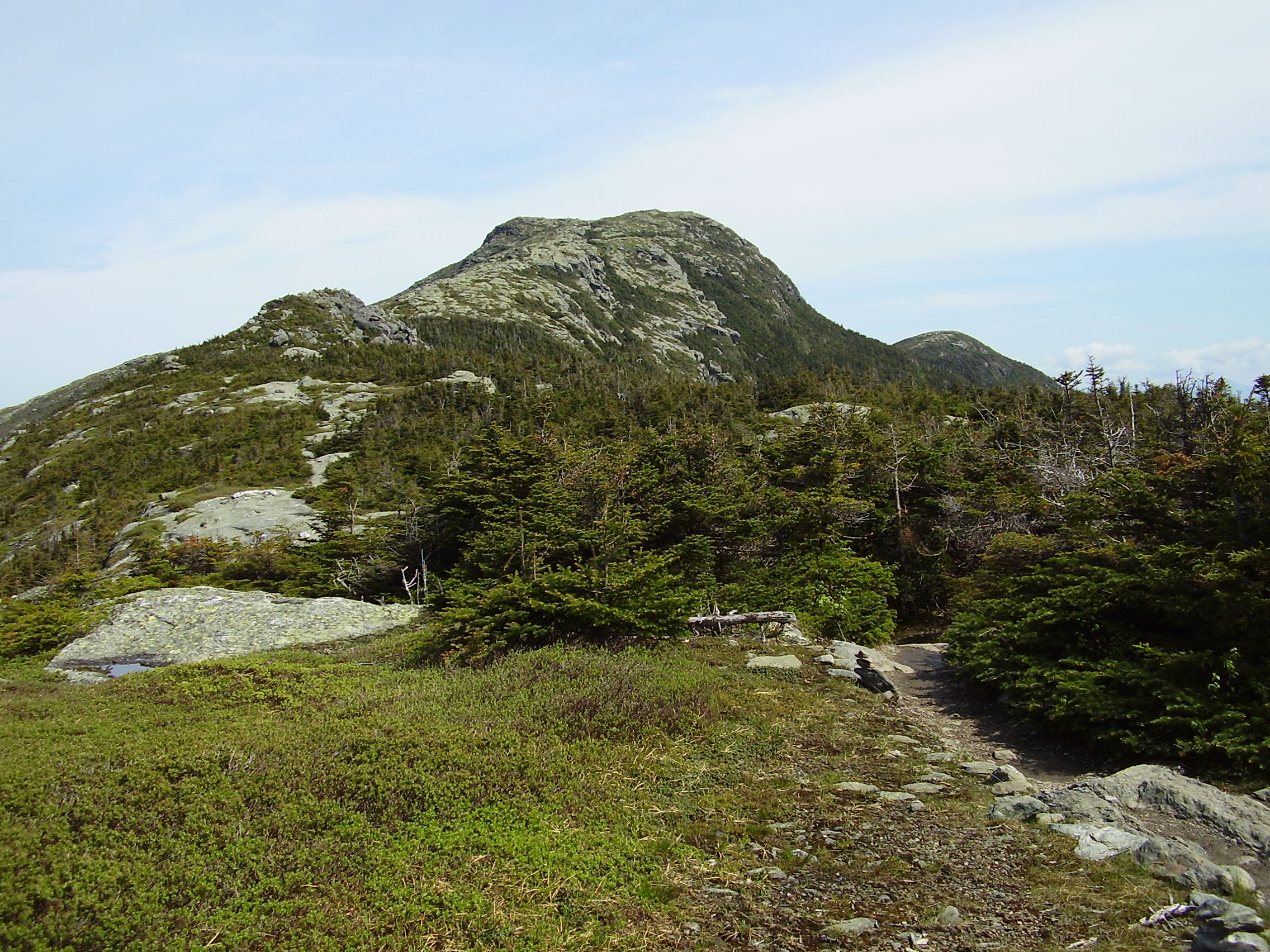
The woods below the top of Mount Mansfield in Vermont are inhabited by T.thoracica and the oyster mushrooms it eats

This beetle inhabits deciduous forests, avoiding dry and sparsely vegetated regions in the Great Plains; at the northern limit of its range it might also utilize conifer-dominated taiga forests. Adults are active whenever the ground is not frozen, typically between mid-March and late October, but in the south of the range they may be encountered almost year-round. Even as far north as southeastern Pennsylvania, it has been collected on March 30 (Unionville, Chester County) and November 25 (Collingdale). In Victoria, Texas, specimens were taken on March 12 and December 28, in Gainesville, Florida, on February 9, and in Columbia, Missouri, near the center of its range, on December 9. It is better-adapted to cold than many other Triplax, as demonstrated by its almost year-round occurrence, its wide Canadian range, and a record from 4,000 feet (1,200 m) AMSL on Mount Mansfield, Vermont. However, as usual for Triplax, they are most commonly encountered between June and August, when they can sometimes be caught on the wing e.g. with a window trap.

As typical for its species complex, they have a strong preference for oyster mushrooms (Pleurotus; Agaricales: Pleurotaceae) as larvae and adults; usually, these beetles are recorded on the common oyster mushroom (Pleurotus ostreatus). The larvae in particular may not be able to eat any other food. Habitat associations with particular tree species would seem to indicate suitable hosts for Pleurotus or good hiding places, rather than a specific preferrence for the tree as such. Trees on which T.thoracica has been collected include maple (Acer, e.g. sugar maple A.saccharum), aspen (Populus sect. Populus), willow (Salix) and hemlock fir (Tsuga).

Unlike most other pleasing fungus beetles, where each species keeps to itself, T.thoracica is markedly more sociable and has, for example, been found together with Dacne quadrimaculata, a non-Tritominae/Tritomini pleasing fungus beetle. Even more frequently, it associates with its presumed closest relative, T. frosti; the differently-built genitalia seem to effectively prevent interbreeding of these two extremely similar species. T.thoracica has also been found together with T.dissimulator and especially T.flavicollis, other members of its species complex; regarding T.flavicollis, it was noted that adults mingle freely, but larvae found with such mixed associations are almost always of one of the two species only. It is not known whether this holds true for T.dissimulator and T.frosti also, but at least in the case of T.thoracica-T.flavicollis associations, the species (whose ecological requirements are all but identical) appear to use some niche partitioning, such as feeding on fresh and moist vs older and drier mushroom bodies, to avoid competition.
