= Triplax errans =

Scientific classification
- Kingdom: Animalia
- Phylum: Arthropoda
- Clade: Pancrustacea
- Class: Insecta
- Order: Coleoptera
- Suborder: Polyphaga
- Infraorder: Cucujiformia
- Family: Erotylidae
- Genus: Triplax
- Species: T. errans

Binomial name
- Triplax errans Boyle, 1956

Species of beetle

Triplax errans is a little-known American species of small pleasing fungus beetle (family Erotylidae). It is placed in subfamily Tritominae (formerly Triplacinae), or – in taxonomic arrangements that prefer a more comprehensive subfamily Erotylinae – in tribe Tritomini of the Erotylinae.

This species is probably one of the "breast-plated" pleasing fungus beetles of the Triplax thoracica cryptic species complex. This large group, other than T.thoracica and T.errans, also includes T.californica, T.cuneata, T.dissimulator, T.flavicollis, T.frosti, T.lacensis, T.mesosternalis, T.microgaster, T.puncticeps and T.wehrlei.

== Description ==
Adults of this beetle are about 2.8-4.5 mm long, and 1.55-2.5 mm wide at the widest point (roughly at half-length). The pronotum of the holotype, and adult male, is 1.1 mm long in the centerline, measures 2.09 mm along its rear edge, and is 1.24 mm between the angles at the front, its sides curving strongly inward towards the head. Across the compound eyes, the head is 1.13 mm wide in the holotype, and the top of the head between its eyes measures 0.78 in width, while the length of its compound eyes is 0.28 mm. The tip segment of the holotype's maxillary palps is 0.47 mm wide. The body is very broad for a Triplax, barely twice as long as it is wide; it reminiscent of the closely related genus Tritoma in proportions, but its pronotum and basal half of the wing sides are almost parallel, not distinctly curving as is usual for Tritoma. The ends of the body are rather abruptly rounded, the head a bit blunter than the wingtip.

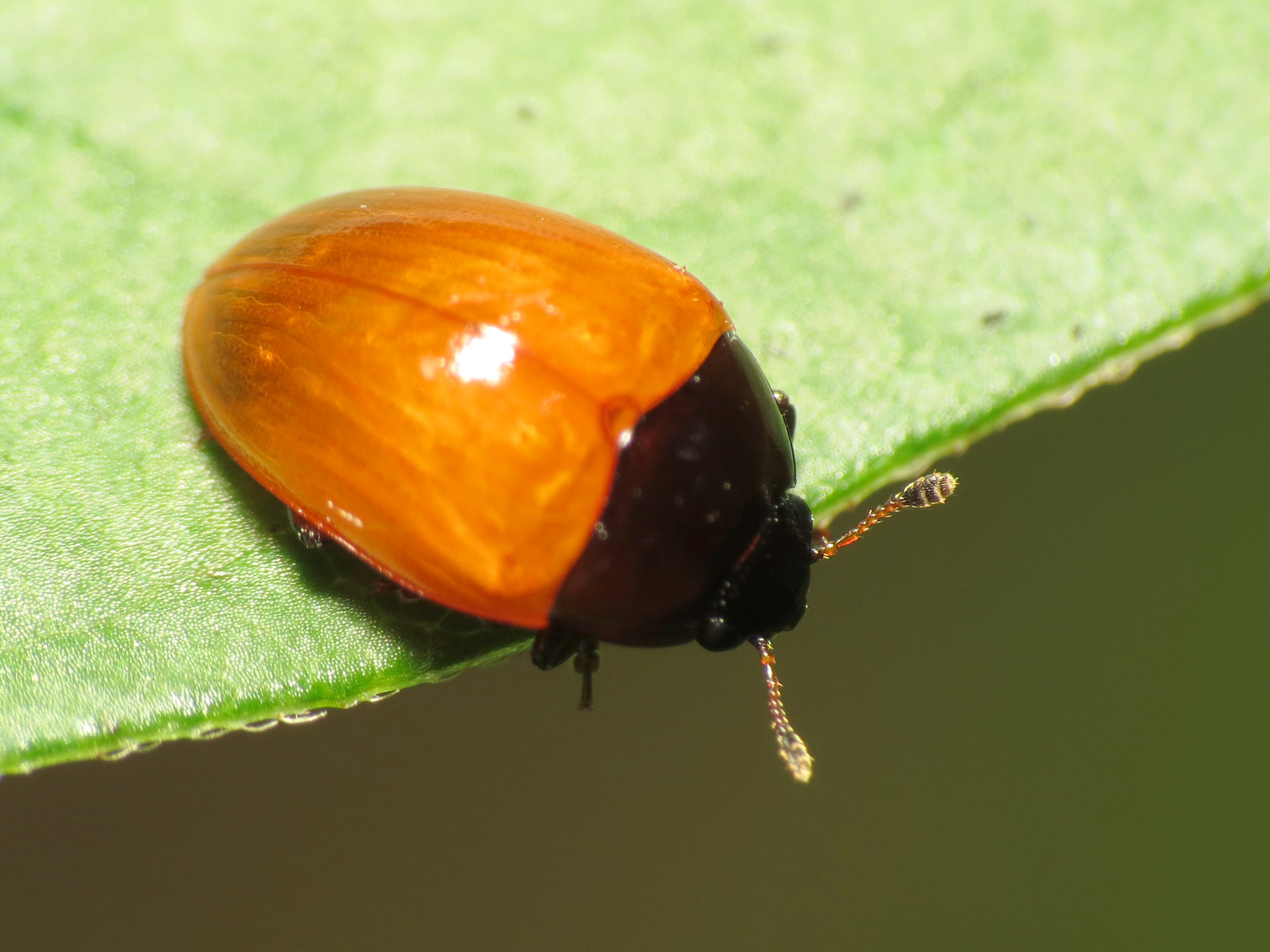
The red-winged tritoma (Rotitma sanguinipennis) is parapatric to T.errans and has the same basic color pattern; it can be recognized by its black legs, light antenna tips, and the much more rotund body shape

The coloration is "inverted" compared the usual pattern in Triplax, which is orange-red with black elytra. The elytra and scutellum of T.errans are bright vermillion red, while the head is black except for the ochre "cheeks". The surface of the carapace is shiny and smooth, with only the top of the head having conspicuous hairs. As usual for the members of the "breast-plated" species complex, T.flavicollis has orange legs and antenna bases (rather dark, almost brown, in this species); the mouthparts, legs, and the rear of the body from the metathorax onwards are the same color, which agrees with the coloration of many Triplax. Antenna segments 3 and 4 are brown, while segments 5 to 7 gradually become darker towards the black "club" which forms the antenna tip.

Its closest relatives are possibly T.dissimulator, T.flavicollis and T.wehrlei, all of which are easily distinguished by their coloration. Among North American Triplax, T.errans is unique and only approximated by very light specimens of Triplax californica antiqua, which is widely allopatric. However, Tritoma sensu lato have often a similar coloration, e.g. Tritoma mimetica or the red-winged tritoma Rotitma sanguinipennis. They can be told apart by details of their anatomy, but with some practice the rotund teardrop-shaped tritomas are easy to distinguish from the pill-shaped and flatter triplaxes.

Head
The head is elongate-oval and well visible from above; it has small compound eyes with tiny ommatidia, indicating a diurnal or crepuscular lifestyle, but with overall rather little reliance on eyesight; it is densely sprinkled with punctures of at least moderate size, with a central hair; at the sides towards the neck, these punctures are slightly more dense, and notably denser on the top of the head, where the central hairs are also longer and clearly protruding from the punctures. Presumably, all T.errans adults possess file-like structures at the sides of the neck attachment, which, when the beetle wiggles its head, rub against the chitin and produce a squeaking sound; as far as is known, such structures are present in all adults of North American Triplax with margined wings. The ocular striae end above the antenna attachments; the wide epistome has a clearly demarked margin along the straight sides, which curve towards the narrow tip which is mostly straight, with a marked concavity in the center. On the tip of the epistome, the margin is covered in coarse puncture. The "cheek" lobes below the compound eyes are small, with strongly rounded side edges which to the rear run almost parallel. The length of the 11-segmented antenna is two-thirds of the pronotal base width, with antenna segment 3 shorter than the segments 4 and 5 together. The "stem" of the antenna has sparse short silvery bristles and bears a "clubbed" antenna tip, which in this species is particularly long. Even segment 7 is expanded to a triangle, almost as wide as segment 8, which forms the base of the "club" proper; the entire "club" is much more than twice as long as it is wide and not very compact.

As for the mouthparts, the galea and lacinia of the maxilla resemble those of the related genus Tritoma, the galea being almost triangular, with a tip carrying sparse bristles at the outer side and a dense pack of bristles on the inner side. The lacinia is also covered in dense bristles, and – unlike in Tritoma – at the tip has two small black incurved teeth, set so closely together that they may appear as a single tooth. The maxillary palps curve inwards and have a first segment that is at least as long as segments 2 and 3 together. Their end segment is somewhat triangular, abruptly cut-off, and almost three times as wide as it is long. Its tip carries a small brush, which consists of a single row of microscopic fleshy finger-like cylinders, which on their sides have many small bristles. The labium has a mentum that is quite small and narrow, with short and almost parallel sides; however, between individuals, size and shape of the mentum are somewhat variable. The labial palps end in a widened hatchet-shaped segment, which is sparsely covered in short bristles, with a longer strong bristle at the outer side. At its tip, it has a tiny brush, much smaller than that at the end of the maxillary palps, and composed of a single row of short smooth nubs.

Body, wings and legs
The prothorax is almost as wide at the base as the wings at their widest point and narrower at the front, giving it a trapezoidal shape. The pronotum is almost rectangular but slightly less wide in front; its sides evenly and strongly curve towards the blunt forward edges. The basal lobe of the pronotum is pronounced but narrow, only the central 20% of the pronotum width. A thin margin runs around the sides and rear of the pronotum, but is absent from the front between the compound eyes. In each corner of the pronotum, there is a sizeable navel-shaped pore, and the pronotum is covered in moderately-sized punctuations, separated from each other by 1-2 times their own diameter but somewhat larger and denser towards the sides. Each of the punctures carries a tiny, inconspicuous, and barely protruding hair. The prosternum and metasternum lack clearly visible lengthwise lines from the center margin of the leg attachments to the rear edge of the prosternum. The sclerites of prosternum, pronotal epipleura, mesosternum, metepisternum and metepimeres are all distinct, and the entire thorax has scattered coarse punctures, with the hair in each at least as long as the puncture is wide. The abdomen consists of 5 sternites, with the first being the widest; lines between the hindleg attachments run along the base of the abdomen, which protrudes as a narrow bent process between the hindleg attachments.

The scutellum is bluntly pentagonal to almost heart-shaped. The elytra have a distinct margin at the base; they are ornamented with regular lines of mid-sized punctuations; between these lines the elytra are strongly shiny and appear smooth, but in fact have an irregular scattering of extremely tiny punctures. The attachments of each leg pair are set narrowly together; the fore- and mid-leg coxae are almost ball-shaped, while those of the hindlegs are wider than long. The trochanters of the hindlegs have a right triangle shape, and the femora are slightly thickened. The tibiae are slightly widened towards the tip (often, but not reliably, slightly wider in males) except on the almost unwidened forelegs, and have a bluntly rounded upper/outer edge. On the 5-segmented tarsi, segment 4 is reduced, attached to the upper centerside of segment 3, and firmly joined to the base segment 5; segment 3 is straight or almost so on all sides.

The aedeagus of the male genitalia has some similarities to that of T.flavicollis and T.wehrlei. It has narrow tegminal arms, down- and forward-curving dorsal struts of the tegmen, and lateral lobes which attach to the tip of the basal piece. The median lobe is slightly curved, with a tipwards membrane at the back surrounding a conspicuously oblique hole in the center; the sclerotization of the median lobe's underside begins at about one-third of the lobe's length of the behind the attachment of the median strut. The internal sac is somewhat shorter than in T.thoracica, extending forward only to the middle of the median strut. It has lengthwise sclerotized stripes at the rear back, with inner edges that form complex folds downwards around the ejaculatory duct. Like in other members of its species complex, a conspicuous black muscle attachment is located at the forward tip of the internal sac. The ejaculatory duct resembles that of T.flavicollis and T.wehrlei; it is fairly short, wide, and enclosed in the internal sac and gradually tapers towards a thin tip which reaches the median foramen. The unstudied female genitalia are probably fairly generic, like in other "breast-plated" Triplax resembling those of other Erotylidae such as Megalodacne, which within the pleasing fungus beetle family is not particularly closely related to Triplax. But while they are proportionally smaller in width compared to the larger-bodied Megalodacne (just like in all Triplax) except for the larger basal segments of the valvifers and the paraprocts, in the "breast-plated" Triplax almost all parts are drastically shortened in length compared to e.g. Triplax macra. However, the styli are sized as in most other Triplax species, and the proctigeral lobe is comparatively oversized, extending up to the valvifer tips. Tergite 8 except for being longer and narrower resembles that of Haematochiton in having strongly sclerotized lines along the sides, and in the centerline near the tip a deep but narrow membranous indentation.

== Distribution and ecology ==
T.errans is a barely-known species with a potentially wide range in the northern Neotropics; it barely reaches the extreme southernmost USA. The type specimen is an adult male, collected on May 30, 1938, at the border town of Brownsville, Texas, by R.I.Sailer; it is stored at the University of Kansas. Other scattered reports are from Central America south to central Guatemala. In Mexico it has specifically been reported from Nuevo León (near the type locality), as well as in San Luis Potosí in north-central Mexico where its occurrence is confirmed in the southeast near the state borders with Hidalgo, Querétaro and Veracruz at Huichihuayan, Tamazunchale, and "Pajal" (Pujal Coy in Ébano Municipality?). The type locality is in the Rio Grande estuary, almost at sea level, in the Western Gulf coastal grasslands bioregion.

While its food is not known, T.errans presumably eats fungi as larvae and adults, like the other members of the T.thoracica with a strong preference for oyster mushrooms (Pleurotus; Agaricales: Pleurotaceae) such as common oyster mushroom (Pleurotus ostreatus).
