= Triplax wehrlei =

Scientific classification
- Kingdom: Animalia
- Phylum: Arthropoda
- Clade: Pancrustacea
- Class: Insecta
- Order: Coleoptera
- Suborder: Polyphaga
- Infraorder: Cucujiformia
- Family: Erotylidae
- Genus: Triplax
- Species: T. wehrlei

Binomial name
- Triplax wehrlei Boyle, 1954

Species of beetle

Triplax wehrlei is an American species of small pleasing fungus beetle (family Erotylidae). It is placed in subfamily Tritominae (formerly Triplacinae), or – in taxonomic arrangements that prefer a more comprehensive subfamily Erotylinae – in tribe Tritomini of the Erotylinae.

This species is probably one of the "breast-plated" pleasing fungus beetles of the Triplax thoracica cryptic species complex. This large group, other than T.thoracica and T.wehrlei, also includes T.californica, T.cuneata, T.dissimulator, T.errans, T.flavicollis, T.frosti, T.lacensis, T.mesosternalis, T.microgaster and T.puncticeps.

== Description ==
Adults of this beetle are about 2.3-4.6 mm long and 1.25-2.3 mm wide, with an elongated elliptical body; in 42 specimens it was noted that the southern (Mexican) specimens were at most 4 mm long and 2 mm wide, while the northern (Arizona) ones were all distinctly larger; since only 3 northern beetles were studied, and all the Mexican ones were from a single region or even collection, this may be just a coincidence. Unlike most of its relatives, the carapace of T.wehrlei is markedly hairy, covered with fine fuzz except on the wings and legs, and quite notably so on the abdomen where the hair is stronger and longer as is usual in Triplax. Like in many of their relatives, head and pronotum are reddish-orange, while the elytra are black and (due to the hair) barely shiny. As usual for the members of the "breast-plated" species complex, T.wehrlei has orange legs and antenna bases and lacks a conspicuous margin to the forehead sides, which also form a well-rounded obtuse angle towards the tip. The "stems" of the antennae are orange to segment 6, turning to black in the "club" at the end of the antennae; the scutellum is blackish-brown. The underside is reddish-orange, in some individuals with blackened episterna of the metathorax. Notably, the thin outer margin of the elytra is colored distinctly orange-red.

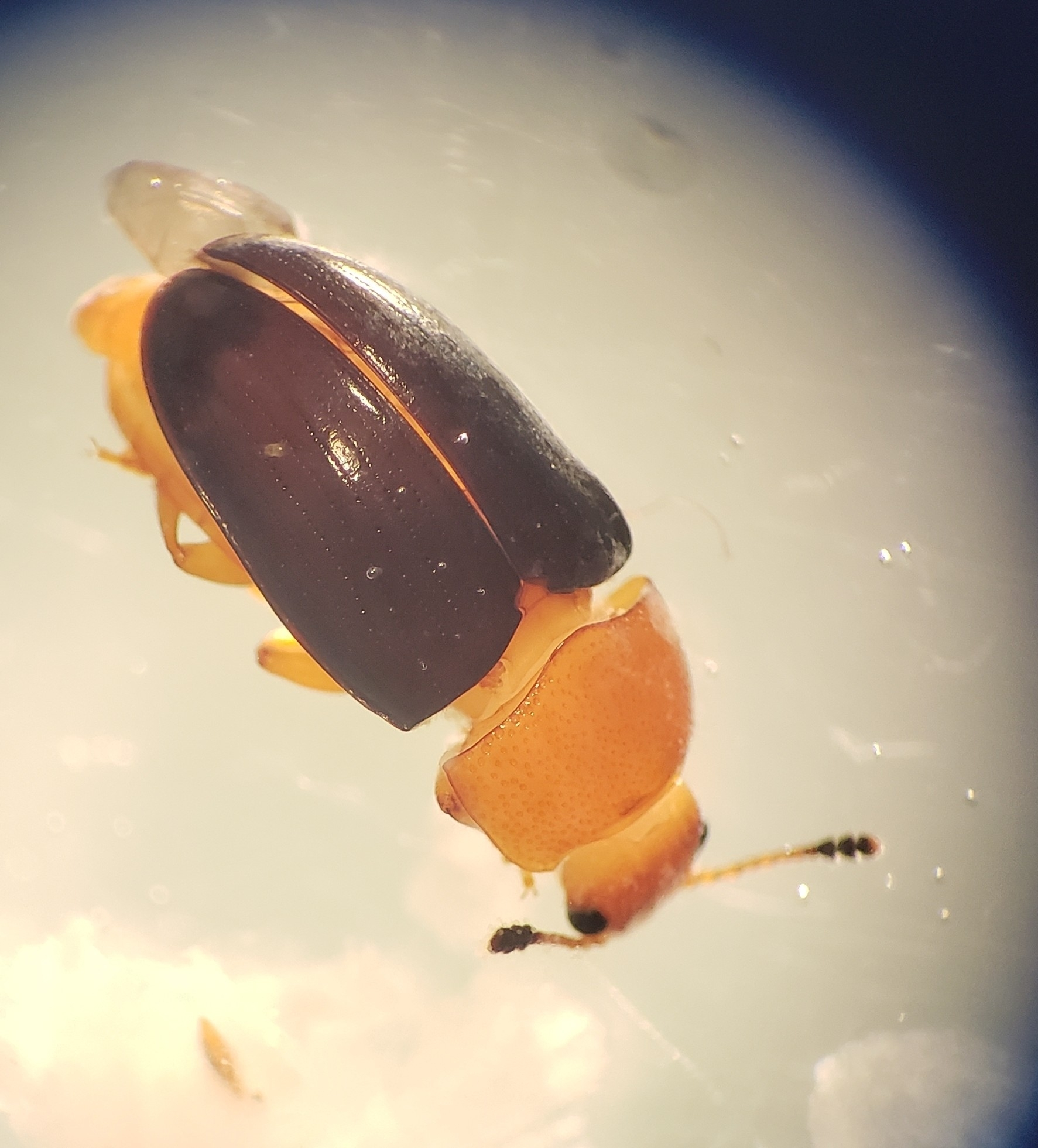
Triplax frosti with its strongly contrasting scutellum resembles T.wehrlei, but lacks wing margins, has shorter antenna "clubs", and a much smoother and shinier carapace

Its presumed closest relatives – T.dissimulator, T.flavicollis and perhaps T.errans differ in having a dark or spotted pronotum except T.flavicollis, which looks much like T.wehrlei but with the rear half of the underside blackish-brown. T.frosti and T.thoracica are even more similar at a casual glance, and the tendency of T.wehrlei to have a distinctly lighter (though not by much) scutellum might even make it seem like a hybrid between those two. But with a good magnifying glass they can immediately be recognized by their unmargined wings; they also differ by their male genitalia and the lack of sound-producing structures in their females. The very long antenna club – similar to T.errans and T.flavicollis – and (except in old and worn specimens) the general hairyness of T.wehrlei are also tell-tale traits.

Head
The head is elongate-oval and well visible from above; it has small compound eyes with tiny ommatidia, indicating a diurnal or crepuscular lifestyle, but with overall rather little reliance on eyesight; it is densely sprinkled with punctures of moderate size, with less distance from each other than their diameter, and a central hair which is unusually well developed by Triplax standards. Presumably, all T.wehrlei adults possess file-like structures at the sides of the neck attachment, which, when the beetle wiggles its head, rub against the chitin and produce a squeaking sound; as far as is known, such structures are present in all adults of North American Triplax with margined wings. The ocular striae end above the antenna attachments; the epistome, unlike in T.macra and its relatives, lacks a margin along the tip and only has indistinct margins on base of the barely bulging sides, which gently curve towards the tip which is mostly straight, with a shallow but distinct V-shaped concavity in the center. The "cheek" lobes below the compound eyes are small, with strongly rounded side edges which to the rear run almost parallel. The length of the 11-segmented antenna is about two-thirds of the pronotal base width, with antenna segment 3 shorter than the segments 4 and 5 together. The "stem" of the antenna has sparse short silvery bristles and bears a "clubbed" antenna tip, which is not very compact but particularly long in this Triplax. Even segment 7 is expanded to a triangle, almost as wide as segment 8, which forms the base of the "club" proper; the total gradually widening structure is much more than twice as long as it is wide.

As for the mouthparts, the galea and lacinia of the maxilla resemble those of the related genus Tritoma, the galea being almost triangular, with a tip carrying sparse bristles at the outer side and a dense pack of bristles on the inner side. The lacinia is also covered in dense bristles, and – unlike in Tritoma – at the tip has two small black incurved teeth, set so closely together that they may appear as a single tooth. The maxillary palps curve inwards and have a first segment that is at least as long as segments 2 and 3 together. Their end segment is somewhat triangular, abruptly cut-off, and more than three times as wide as it is long. Its tip carries a small brush, which consists of a single row of microscopic fleshy finger-like cylinders, which on their sides have many small bristles. The labium has a mentum that is quite small and narrow, with short and almost parallel sides; however, between individuals, size and shape of the mentum are somewhat variable. The labial palps end in a widened hatchet-shaped segment, which is sparsely covered in short bristles, with a longer strong bristle at the outer side. At its tip, it has a tiny brush, much smaller than that at the end of the maxillary palps, and composed of a single row of short smooth nubs.

Body, wings and legs
The prothorax is almost as wide at the base as the wings at their widest point and narrower at the front, giving it a trapezoidal shape. The pronotum is trapezoid-shaped, with the rear edge around two-thirds again as long as the forward edge; its sides gently curve in front. A thin margin runs around the sides and rear of the pronotum, but is absent from the front between the compound eyes. In each corner of the pronotum, there is a sizeable navel-shaped pore, and the pronotum is covered in moderately-dense moderately-sized punctuations, separated from each other by their own diameter. The sclerites of prosternum, pronotal epipleura, mesosternum, metepisternum and metepimeres are all distinct, and the prosternum and metasternum lack clearly visible lengthwise lines from the center margin of the leg attachments to the rear edge of the prosternum. The abdomen consists of 5 sternites, with the first being the widest; lines between the hindleg attachments run along its base, which protrudes as a narrow bent process between the hindleg attachments.

The scutellum is bluntly pentagonal to almost heart-shaped. The elytra have a distinct margin at the base; they are ornamented with regular lines of mid-sized punctuations, and have punctures of about the same size but at twice the density randomly scattered in between these lines, where the elytral surface is also strongly ornamented by microscopic reticulated fissures. The attachments of each leg pair are set narrowly together; the fore- and mid-leg coxae are almost ball-shaped, while those of the hindlegs are wider than long. The trochanters of the hindlegs have a right triangle shape, and the femora are slightly thickened. The tibiae are slightly widened towards the tip (often, but not reliably, slightly wider in males) except on the barely widened forelegs, and have a bluntly rounded upper/outer edge. On the 5-segmented tarsi, segment 4 is reduced, attached to the upper centerside of segment 3, and firmly joined to the base segment 5; segment 3 is straight or almost so on all sides.

The aedeagus of the male genitalia is very similar to that of T.flavicollis. It has narrow tegminal arms, down- and forward-curving dorsal struts of the tegmen, and lateral lobes which attach to the tip of the basal piece. The median lobe is slightly curved, with a tipwards membrane at the back surrounding a hole in the center. The internal sac is somewhat shorter than in T.thoracica, extending forward only to the middle of the median strut. It has fairly short lengthwise sclerotized stripes at the rear back, with inner edges that reach downwards around the ejaculatory duct. Like in other members of its species complex, a conspicuous black muscle attachment is located at the forward tip of the internal sac; as a key difference to T.flavicollis, in T.wehrlei it has wing-like extensions which give it a pincer shape. The ejaculatory duct resembles that of T.flavicollis; it is fairly short, wide, and enclosed in the internal sac and gradually tapers towards a thin tip which reaches the median foramen. The female genitalia are fairly generic, resembling those of other Erotylidae such as Megalodacne, which within the pleasing fungus beetle family is not particularly closely related to Triplax. But while they are proportionally smaller in width compared to the larger-bodied Megalodacne (just like in all Triplax) except for the larger basal segments of the valvifers and the paraprocts, almost all parts are drastically shortened in length compared to e.g. Triplax macra. However, the styli are sized as in most other Triplax species, and the proctigeral lobe is comparatively oversized, extending up to the valvifer tips. Tergite 8 except for being longer and narrower resembles that of Haematochiton in having strongly sclerotized lines along the sides, and in the centerline near the tip a deep but narrow membranous indentation.

== Distribution and ecology ==
T.wehrlei is a little-known species with a potentially wide range in the northern Neotropics. The type specimen is a male, collected on July 9, 1930, at Patagonia, Arizona, by J.O.Martin. Additional United States records are from the Pinal and Santa Rita Mountains. The species has also been reported from Mexico, where it might range at least to the Isthmus of Tehuantepec and has been found in considerable numbers in Morelos State.

Its ecology is barely known; dated specimens are from June and July, when Triplax are most abundantly encountered. It might range up to altitudes of 7,000 ft or more (over 2,000 m) AMSL, but the type locality is only at about 4,000 ft (1,200 m). While it seems to occur on some of the "sky island" mountains that rise at the boundary of the Chihuahuan and Sonoran Desert, catching moisture and growing a northernly extension of the Sierra Madre Occidental pine–oak forests of Mexico, it is not strictly associated with upland forest; Morelos State is entirely in the Balsas Dry Forests ecoregion. However, the fairly closely related (and just as little-known) Haematochiton carbonarius seems to ba a "sky island" beetle with a similar moderate-altitude distribution as T.wehrlei.

While its food is not known, T.wehrlei presumably eats fungi as larvae and adults, like the other members of the T.thoracica with a strong preference for oyster mushrooms (Pleurotus; Agaricales: Pleurotaceae) such as common oyster mushroom (Pleurotus ostreatus).
