= Telomere (insect morphology) =

Type of genital clasper in insects

A telomere (pl.; telomeres or telomeron), literally "end piece", is a term in insect morphology, and refers to a type of "genital clasper"; (i.e., in Mallophaga, a part of the genital sac that forms a sclerotized plate on both sides of the male reproductive organ). The telomere may have sensilla.

In adult insects, genital claspers may develop in two segments, a proximal basimere and a distal telomere.
