= Dacne pubescens =

Scientific classification
- Domain: Eukaryota
- Kingdom: Animalia
- Phylum: Arthropoda
- Class: Insecta
- Order: Coleoptera
- Suborder: Polyphaga
- Infraorder: Cucujiformia
- Family: Erotylidae
- Genus: Dacne
- Species: D. pubescens

Binomial name
- Dacne pubescens Boyle, 1956

Species of beetle

Dacne pubescens is a species of pleasing fungus beetle in the family Erotylidae. It is found in North America.
