= Sclerotization =

Biochemical process in insects

Sclerotization is a biochemical process that produces the rigid shell of sclerotin that comprises an insect's chitinous exoskeleton. It is prominent in the thicker, armored parts of insects and arachnids, especially in the biting mouthparts and sclerites of scorpions and beetles.

== Molecular mechanism ==
Sclerotization entails crosslinking of oxygen-reactive derivatives of dopamine. The reaction of the dopamine derivatives toward oxygen is catalyzed by diverse enzymes such as laccase, which convert the catechol groups to quinones. The resulting quinones are susceptible to nucleophilic attack by amines and thiols, which decorate the side-chains of proteins. These reactions gives rise to color (typically brown), loss of solubility, and rigidification that accompany sclerotization.

Proposed sequence of reactions with N-acetyldopamine as substrate resulting in sclerotization. The middle step is catalyzed by quinone isomerase.

== See also ==
- Sclerotin
- Sclerite
