= Haematochiton carbonarius =

Scientific classification
- Kingdom: Animalia
- Phylum: Arthropoda
- Clade: Pancrustacea
- Class: Insecta
- Order: Coleoptera
- Suborder: Polyphaga
- Infraorder: Cucujiformia
- Family: Erotylidae
- Genus: Haematochiton
- Species: H. carbonarius

Binomial name
- Haematochiton carbonarius (Gorham, 1888)

Synonyms
- Haematochiton opacus (Schaeffer, 1915); Scaeother carbonarius Gorham, 1888; Scaeother opacus Schaeffer, 1915

Species of beetle

Haematochiton carbonarius is a small black species of pleasing fungus beetle (family Erotylidae) from Central and North America. Among its family, the genus Haematochiton is placed in subfamily Tritominae, or – in taxonomic arrangements that prefer a more comprehensive subfamily Erotylinae – in tribe Tritomini of the Erotylinae.

Whether the small and little-studied genus Haematochiton is distinct from its close relative, the hugely successful Mycotretus radiation, remains to be determined. When Henry S. Gorham first named the present species in 1888, he placed into a monotypic genus Scaeother due to its distinctive dull coal-black coloration, not recognizing the traits that linked it to Haematochiton elateroides (which he described in the same work) and Mycotretus (which are usually boldly patterned or brightly colored).

Charles F.A.Schäffer in 1915 believed he could distinguish two species in these beetles, and named his "new" species Scaeother opacus; the supposed differences are, however, within normal variation in this species – more or less dense punctuation on the upperside, and a rounded or keel-shaped pronotal bulge –, and no subspecies are rcognized today.

== Description ==
Haematochiton carbonarius are small beetles, about one-fifth of an inch long and slightly less than half as wide (around 4.5-4.65 mm long and 2.2 mm wide) as adults. They are black all over except for the tarsi, palps, and the five basal antenna segments, which are brown. Most of the carapace is covered in microscopic reticulated relief that makes it look matte. The body is elliptical, with a smoothly rounded head and a slightly more pointed wingtip.

Head
The head is elongate-oval and well visible from above; it lacks file-like structures for stridulation at least in females, and has no constriction between the rather small compound eyes. The individual ommatidia are also small (slightly bigger than in Triplax); H.carbonarius is probably diurnal or crepuscular, but generally does not seem to rely on eyesight much. The "cheek" lobes are at most mid-sized; the clypeus has a smooth front edge. The epistome is unmargined, due to the ocular striae not reaching beyond the antenna insertion points, and ends in an almost straight edge with a slight concave indentation; the mouth-cavity sides are flattened lobes. The head is covered in mid-sized punctures, each separated from the next by its diameter. The antenna length is about two-thirds of the pronotal base width, with antenna segment 3 almost as long as the segments 4 and 5 together, and a large "club" forming the antenna tip.

The maxillary palps are curved, with a basal segment that is as long as segments 2 and 3 together, and an end segment that is rounded, just half as long as it is wide, and lacks a brush; the maxillary lacinia have two incurved teeth at the tip. The labium has a moderately-sized and roughly square-shaped mentum with a three-pointed tip, and palps which end in a comparatively small segment with a strong bristle at the outer side and a squarely cut-off tip which bears a tiny brush. The postmandibular lobes are little developed and effectively invisible.

Body
The prothorax is almost as wide at the base as the wings at their widest point. The pronotum is almost square, with a slight forward bulge in the middle; the forward edge has a slight headward bulge, is barely shorter than the rear edge, and about as wide as the pronotum's midline; the pronotum sides curve slightly towards the forward and rear ends. A thin margin runs around the pronotum except on the forward edge between the compound eyes, unlike in Mycotretus where the pronotal margin is continuous all around. Unlike in most Triplax, there are no conspicuous navel-shaped pores in the corners of the pronotum, but it is strewn with punctures of modest size and depth just like the head. The tip of the prosternum is vertically evenly rounded and not compressed; the lengthwise lines at the center margin of the leg attachments run almost parallel, with a slight widening to the rear. On the meso- and metasternum and the abdomen, the lines between the leg attachments are very thin and hard to see.

Males, but not females, have a conspicuous roughly punctated spot in the center of the underside of the first abdominal segment. The aedeagus of the male genitalia strikingly resembles that of Mycotretus nigromanicatus, in having a distinctive anterior end of the internal sac. The tegminal arms have distinct mediodorsal lobes, the median lobe has only a vestigial membrane at the back of the markedly pointed tip, and the ejaculatory duct is conspicuous by its large diameter. On the other hand, the female genitalia resemble various other Erotylidae in their details: The genital tube is overall shaped as in Ischyrus quadripunctatus, however the seminal receptacle lacks the conspicuously large extension seen in that species. There is one very long bristle in the middle of each stylus as in Aporotritoma pulchra. Tergite 8 resembles that of Triplax thoracica except for being twice as wide as it is long, with strongly sclerotized lines along the sides, and in the centerline near the tip a deep but narrow membranous indentation.

Wings and legs
The elytra have a distinct margin at the base, which does not extend all the way to the tip; they are ornamented with regular lines of larger punctures, with the areas between these lines irregularly strewn with smaller punctures; the scutellum is likewise strewn with small punctures. The scutellum is angular, almost pentagonal. The attachments of each leg pair are neither particularly close or conspicuously far away. The tibiae are slender, slightly curved and a bit widened towards the ends. The first three segments of the tarsi are increasingly widened; segment 4 is reduced in size, attached to the upper centerside of segment 3, and rigidly joined to the base of segment 5 whose claw-bearing tip ends in three spikes.

== Distribution and ecology ==
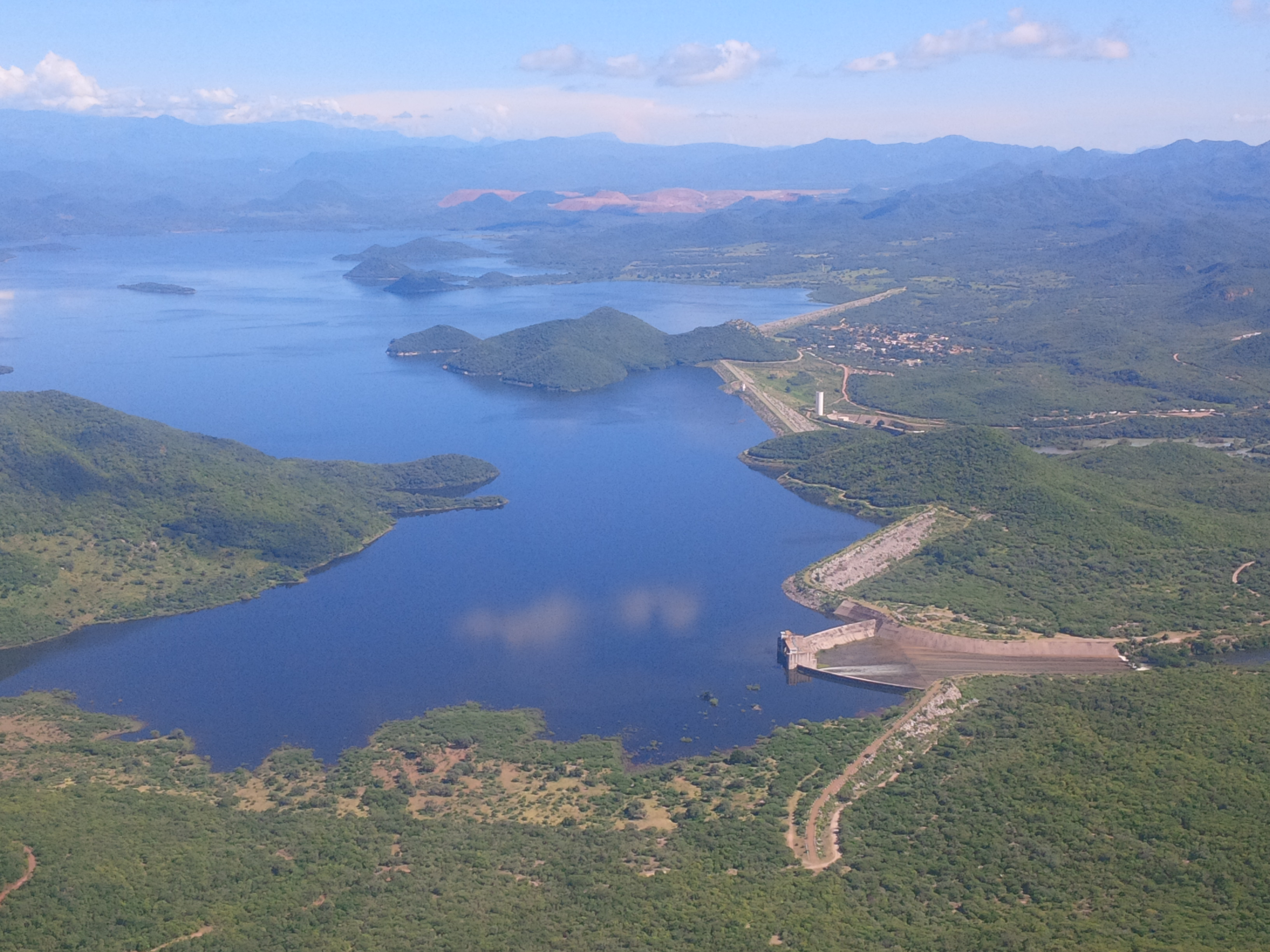
Around the Adolfo Ruiz Cortines Reservoir on Mayo River, abundant Sinaloan dry forests remain. H.carbonarius has been found in this region.

This beetle was described by Henry S. Gorham in 1888 based on specimens from Toluca at the Lerma River headwaters southwest of Mexico City; the type specimen is now in the Natural History Museum, London. H.carbonarius was also reported from Oaxaca City in southern Mexico (but still west of the Isthmus of Tehuantepec), and in northwestern Mexico at or near the middle or lower Mayo River in southern Sonora. Finally, specimens were collected in southern Arizona, US, e.g. at Carr Canyon, the Huachuca Mountains and Hereford (all in Cochise County), and from the Duquesne Road in Santa Cruz County.

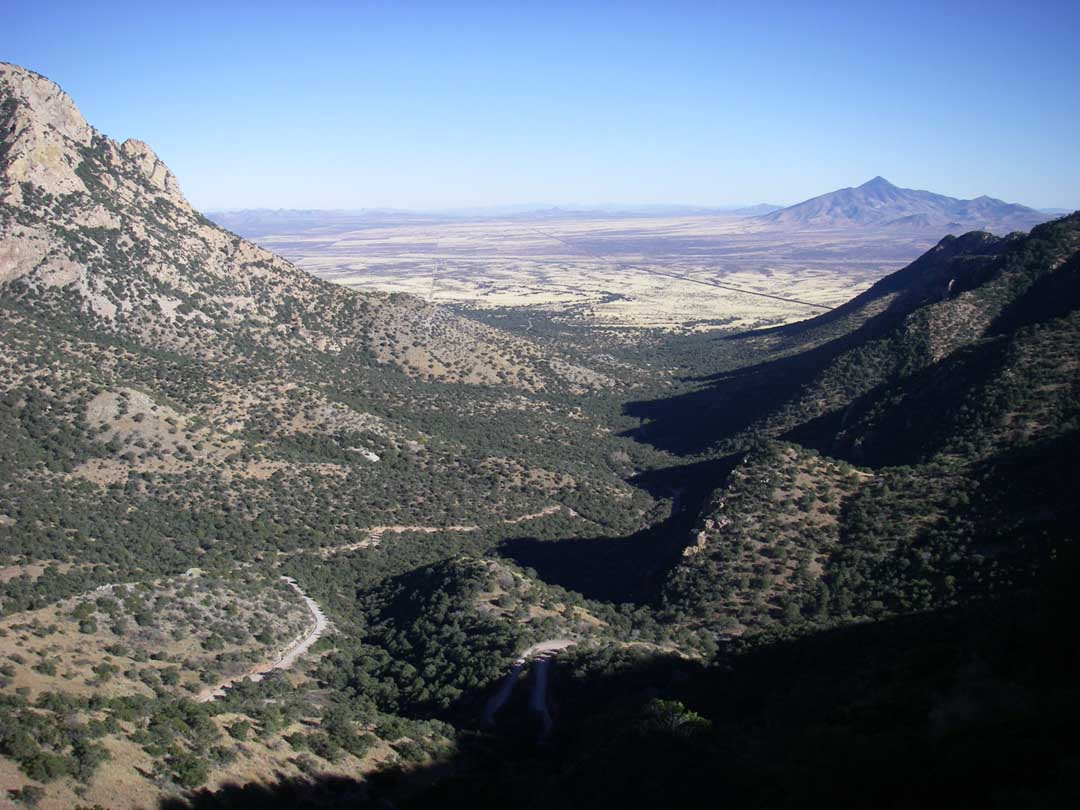
H.carbonarius habitat in Arizona near the border of Cochise and Santa Cruz countries, surrounded by the Chihuahuan Desert

Toluca is the highest specified locality for this beetle, at almost 9,000 ft (over 2,600 m) AMSL. Oaxaca City is above 5,000 ft (over 1,500 m), while the Sonora locality might be as low as 700 ft (more than 200 m), but possibly (the top of Cerro Aguja Bacachaca) almost 4,300 ft (1,300 m) above sea level. Other Haematochiton species, as far as is known, also seem to prefer higher elevations. The ecoregion at the Sinaloa locality is probably Sinaloan dry forests, while Toluca is in the Balsas dry forests region. Oaxaca City is at a major ecoregion boundary, where the southernmost extent of the Balsas dry forests meets its coastal counterpart, the Southern Pacific dry forests, in a lower-lying gap between the Oaxacan and Southern Sierra Madre pine-oak forests. The presumed closest living relative of H.carbonarius, H.elateroides, is a pine-oak forest specialist, so H.carbonarius is more likely than not adapted to mediterranean to subtropical dry upland forests, apparently not ranging as far up as H.elateroides (which is usually found around 8,000-9,000 ft/2,500-3,000 m).

While it is not quite clear where in Arizona the species was first found, the recent records are from the "sky island" mountains that rise at the boundary of the Chihuahuan and Sonoran Desert, catching moisture and growing a northernly extension of the Sierra Madre Occidental pine–oak forests; at high altitudes H.elateroides is also found on these mountains. But while the Huachuca Mountains rise up to almost 10,000 ft (3,000 m), Hereford is at about 4,200 ft (1,300 m) and the Carr and Duquesne localities at around 5,300-5,500 ft (1,600-1,700 m); in Arizona, too, H.carbonarius seems to occur at lower altitudes than H.elateroides. The closest equivalent to the Mexican dry forests in Arizona are the dry upland forests south of the Mogollon Rim, which extent in a vast arc from the northwest to the east of the state but also spottily occur at lower elevations on the "sky islands". H.carbonarius might be widespread (albeit rare or hard to find) in this habitat; if so, it is probably also found in adjacent western and possibly central New Mexico, where the same kinds of forests grow. It seems to be most easily met with in summer; the few dated specimens there are were taken in July and August. Beyond this, however, its ecology remains elusive; as late as 1967, nothing at all was known about this beetle's habits.
