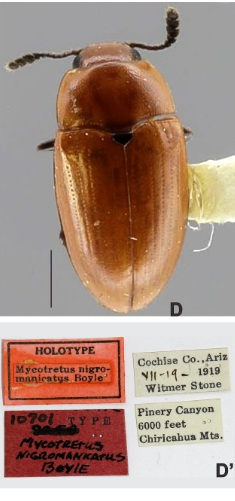
- The holotype specimen was probably collected soon after molting from the pupa - its coloration is more yellow than usual

Scientific classification
- Kingdom: Animalia
- Phylum: Arthropoda
- Clade: Pancrustacea
- Class: Insecta
- Order: Coleoptera
- Suborder: Polyphaga
- Infraorder: Cucujiformia
- Family: Erotylidae
- Genus: Mycotretus
- Species: M. nigromanicatus

Binomial name
- Mycotretus nigromanicatus Boyle, 1954

= Mycotretus nigromanicatus =

Species of beetle

Mycotretus nigromanicatus is an enigmatic small reddish pleasing fungus beetle species in family Erotylidae, occurring in Central and North America. Among its family, the genus Mycotretus is placed in subfamily Tritominae, or – in taxonomic arrangements that prefer a more comprehensive subfamily Erotylinae – in tribe Tritomini of the Erotylinae.

Among its Mycotretus relatives, this species strongly resembles M.bistrigatus in body shape and the hue of its reddish color. It is possible these two are closely related species or even color morphs or subspecies of a single species, in which case M.nigromanicatus would be subsumed into M.bistrigatus. Also, in its overall appearance and specific anatomical details, it is strikingly similar to some unusual beetles traditionally separated in genus Haematochiton. Little is known about M.nigromanicatus, which is a major obstacle in resolving the taxonomic status of Mycotretus in general and Haematochiton in particular.

== Description ==
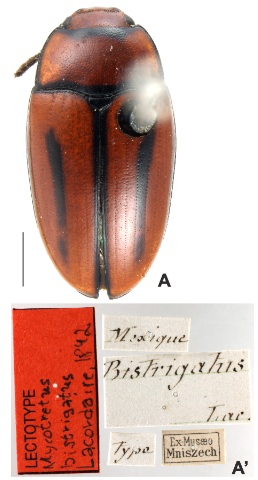
Except for the black pattern, M.bistrigatus looks identical to a fully mature M.nigromanicatus.

Mycotretus nigromanicatus is a small beetle, slightly more than 0.2 in long and around 0.1 in wide on average (around 5-5.5 mm long, 2.5 mm wide) as adults. Their body is elliptical, without conspicuous hairs, smoothly rounded on all sides, and fairly flat-backed. The antennae, scutellum and legs (except for the coxae) are black in color. Otherwise, M.nigromanicatus is bright orange-red all over. The holotype specimen is strikingly lighter than others, more of a brownish orange-yellow. Most likely, this specimen was caught soon after the adult's eclosion from the pupa, before its exoskeleton could fully harden and achieve its full hardness and color.

Head
The head seems to lack file-like structures for stridulation, and has no constriction between the rather small compound eyes. The individual ommatidia are also small; this genus is probably diurnal or crepuscular, but generally does not seem to rely on eyesight much. All over the head there are small shallow punctures, separated by about 2.5 times their diameter, but more densely-set at the base of the top of the head. The epistome is unmargined, due to the ocular striae at most barely reaching the antenna insertion points, and ends in an almost straight edge with a slight concave indentation. The antenna length is about two-thirds of the pronotal base width or a bit more, with antenna segment 3 almost as long as the segments 4 and 5 together, and a "clubbed" antenna tip. This is formed by the last 5 segments, gradually widening to a rounded triangle in segment 7 and reaching its full width with segment 9.

The maxillary palps have an end segment that is rounded, half as long as it is wide, and does not carry a brush; the maxillary lacinia probably has two incurved teeth at the tip (but this needs to be verified). The labium has a large and almost square mentum with a weakly pointed tip, and palps which end in a comparatively small hatchet-shaped segment with a strong bristle at the outer side and a sharply cut-off tip which bears a tiny brush. The postmandibular lobes are very little developed and effectively invisible.

Body, wings and legs
The prothorax is almost as wide at the base as the wings at their widest point. The pronotum is fairly wide and trapezoid-shaped, with the forward edge slightly shorter than the rear edge, and the pronotal length somewhat smaller than the forward edge; the sides curve towards the forward end. A thin margin runs all around the pronotum, but may be only weakly developed (but not fully absent) on the front edge between the compond eyes. There are no conspicuous pores in the corners of the pronotum, but it is covered in small shallow punctures, separated by about 2.5 times their diameter. The tip of the prosternum is not compressed, but has a weak convexity in the center if seen from below; the lengthwise lines at the center margin of the leg attachments do not notably extend forward of these, are strongly engraved, and run almost parallel.

On the mesosternum, there are no obvious lines between the leg attachments; on the metasternum such lines are more clearly engraved. The scutellum is bluntly heart-shaped. The elytra are ornamented with regular lines of mid-sized punctuations, with smaller ones strewn moderately dense in the intervals between these lines; the elytra also have a distinct margin at the base, which ends partway to the wingtip. The underside of the body is covered in small sparse punctures. The attachments of each leg pair are neither particularly close or conspicuously far away. The tibiae are not widened towards the ends. Segment 4 of the tarsi is reduced, and attached to the upper centerside of segment 3.

It is likely that males, but not females, have a conspicuous roughly punctated spot in the center of the underside of the first abdominal segment. The aedeagus of the male genitalia at least in some species strikingly resembles that of Haematochiton in having a distinctive anterior end of the internal sac, whose main body is long and winds around the ejaculatory duct which is also sizeable. Along the centerline of the back and tip of the median lobe, the internal sac has a long and broad orifice. The median lobe is strongly sclerotized outside the orifice, weakly curved, with an even taper towards an abruptly cut-off tip. The female genitalia are undescribed as of 2023. Presumably, they are reminiscent of Triplax species such as T.thoracica, with an eighth tergite which has strongly sclerotized lines along the sides, and in the centerline near the tip a deep but narrow membranous indentation.

Apparently, as of 2023 no larvae or pupae of these beetles have been found by scientists. More than half a century after its description, very few specimens were known, which are overwhelmingly or entirely adult males. It is unclear if this is a coincidence, and if not, what reasons are behind it.

== Distribution and ecology ==
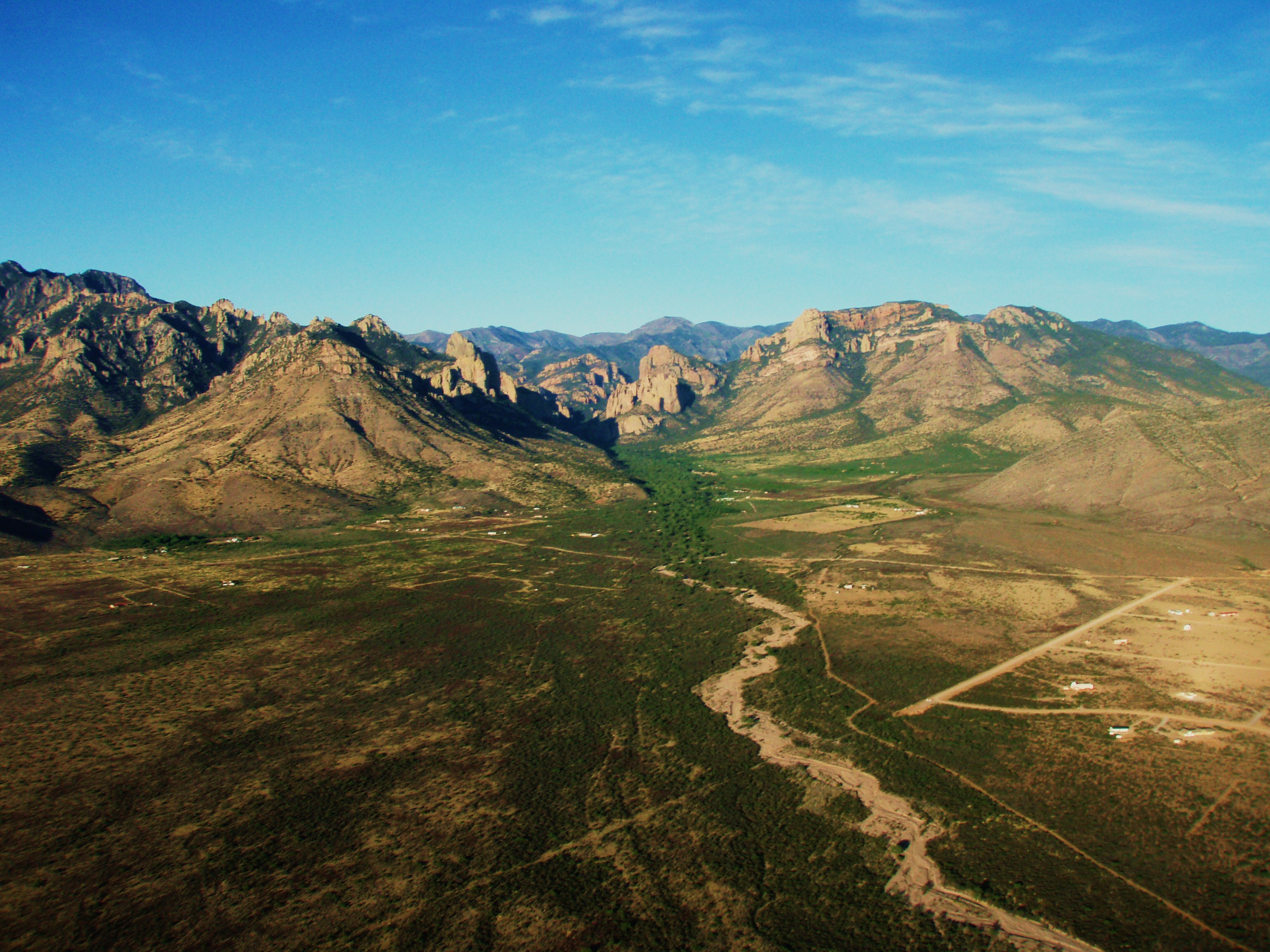
Cave Creek Canyon in the Chiricahua Mountains - the type locality of M.nigromanicatus is behind the mountains right of center

This beetle has been reported from a few sites in the southwestern USA and east-central Mexico. The type specimen ANSP 10701 was caught on July 19, 1919 by Witmer Stone in Pinery Canyon of the Chiricahua Mountains, Cochise County, Arizona, close to the Mexican border at an altitude of about 6,000 ft (c.1,800 m) AMSL. Stone had a curatorial job at the Academy of Natural Sciences of Philadelphia at that time, and probably came across the beetle on one of the many field excursions he did with the ANSP team. While he was fairly knowledgeable about beetles, he did generally not know them down to species level, his main interest being birds, whose almost 50,000 ANSP specimens he was reviewing at that time. Thus, the beetle specimen went into the museum's insect collection with no in-depth assessment, and was only recognized as a new species when Wilford Boyle reviewed it after almost 40 years.

Another specimen in the USNM was from Huatusco, Veracruz, near the Gulf of Mexico coast. It was found on January 14, 1949 and is also annotated "El Paso 57823", perhaps the collector's reference. A third specimen was collected by Vincent Vesterby on August 8, 1963, in the Madera Canyon of the Santa Rita Mountains in Arizona, the altitude not specified but almost certainly between 4,500 and 6,500 ft (1,300-2,000 m) or a bit higher. While the two Arizonan localities are only about 100 miles (150 km) apart, the Mexican site is about 1,300 miles (almost 2,000 km) to the southeast. Its surroundings, much like the Arizonan sizes, are at altitudes between 3,500 and 6,500 ft (about 1,000-2,000 m).

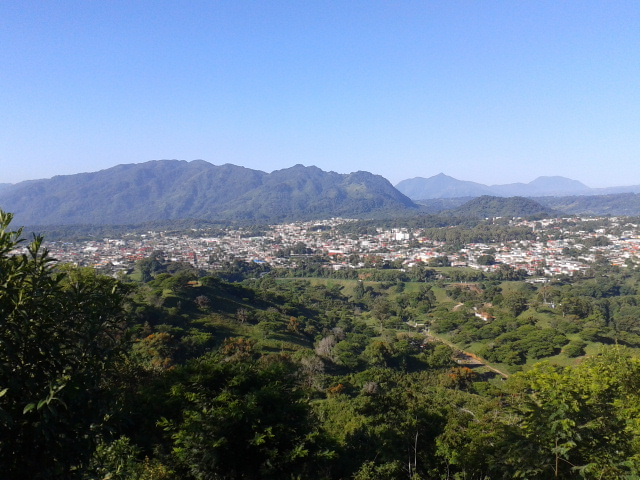
The landscape around Huatusco is dominated by dense moist forest of various types, changing with altitude

The Arizonan records are from canyons in the "sky island" mountains that rise at the boundary of the Chihuahuan and Sonoran Desert, catching moisture and growing a northernly extension of the Sierra Madre Occidental pine–oak forests. The equally enigmatic and apparently closely related Haematochiton carbonarius is known from the same altitudes (though so far not the same sites) in Arizona, while H.elateroides is known from higher altitudes in the same region. The Mexican record is from a region where patches of Oaxacan montane forests on mountains of modest height separate the southernmost extents of Veracruz moist forests in the lowlands to the east from the higher-altitude Trans-Mexican Volcanic Belt pine–oak forests to the west. Just a bit further east, the Veracruz dry forests grow in the coastal plain, but these are very low-lying lands, less than 300 ft (100 m) above sea level. However, within a few dozen miles/km south and southwest of Huatusco, Tehuacán Valley matorral and Sierra Madre de Oaxaca pine–oak forests, respectively, become the dominant landscapes at the altitudes where M.nigromanicatus is found. Outlying patches of such habitat might occur near Huatusco. Its collection date - January - is also somewhat unusual, and as noted above, there is good reason to assume that adults are emerging from their pupae in southeastern Arizona in mid-July.

H.carbonarius is apparently a subtropical dry-forest specialist, which utilizes the lower reaches of Sierra Madre Occidental pine–oak forests in Arizona, and in Mexico seems to occur in the inland, not particularly close to either coast. H.elateroides, by contrast, seems to occur on the Pacific side of Mexico, and is generally found at high elevations in montane pine forests with a Mediterranean-type climate. M.nigromanicatus is less straightforward in its habitat associations. A common denominator seems to be the presence of oak (Quercus) species, which are common even in the moist-subtropical Mexican habitats near the Gulf coast, which are poor in conifers and east of all Haematochiton records known so far. In the Pinery Canyon at 6,000 ft, the habitat is described as "oak juniper woodlands" transitioning to "mixed conifers". The Huatusco specimen was recovered from an "orchid"; given the generally dense and moist local forests, it was more likely an epiphyte than ground-growing, but nothing certain is known. As for the large gap in the range of M.nigromanicatus, it is notable that H.carbonarius has been ascertained over an even wider range due to its records being more evenly distributed.

As for M.bistrigatus, it is only recorded from Mexico so far. Also scarcely known, a verified occurrence is in Omiltemi Ecological State Park in the Sierra Madre del Sur pine–oak forests ecoregion near the Pacific coast. This is about 200 mi (330 km) southwest of the southernmost known occurrence of M.nigromanicatus, and about 185 mi (300 km) west of the southernmost H.carbonarius record. Of this species, only adult females are verified.
