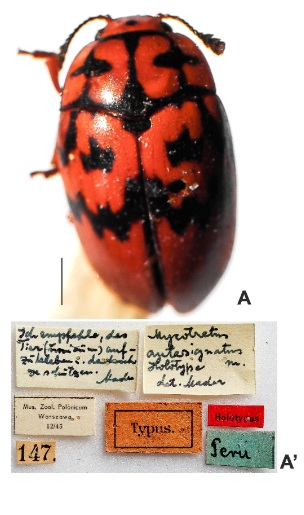
- Mycolybas antesignatus was formerly in Mycotretus

Scientific classification
- Kingdom: Animalia
- Phylum: Arthropoda
- Clade: Pancrustacea
- Class: Insecta
- Order: Coleoptera
- Suborder: Polyphaga
- Infraorder: Cucujiformia
- Family: Erotylidae
- Tribe: Tritomini
- Genus: Mycolybas; Crotch, 1876

Type species
- Lybas lucidus Lacordaire, 1842

Synonyms
- Micolybas (lapsus)

= Mycolybas =

Genus of beetles

Mycolybas is a small genus of pleasing fungus beetles (family Erotylidae). They occur in the Neotropics from Honduras to northern Argentina.

Somewhat difficult to distinguish from their close relative Mycotretus, Mycolybas can be told apart from that genus by a combination of a pentagonal mentum, more bulging "shoulders", and a characteristic layout of the flagellar head of the male genitalia. At least the two type species can also be distinguished by the lacinia of their maxilla: in Mycotretus lesueuri these have two small curved teeth at the tip, which are absent in Mycolybas lucidus. Whether this distinction also holds true for the other species of Mycolybas – especially after the recent re-ordering of taxa – is not yet known.

== Species ==
As of 2023, the following species are placed here:

- Mycolybas antesignatus (Mader, 1942)
- Mycolybas atribruneicrus Lopes, 2006
- Mycolybas bicolorcrus Lopes, 2006
- Mycolybas coccineipennis (Motschulsky, 1858)
- Mycolybas lucidus (Lacordaire, 1842) (= M.cruentatus, M.egae, M.melanocorynus)
- Mycolybas rufipennis Guérin, 1956
- Mycolybas sanguinosus (Motschulsky, 1858)

It is possible that undescribed Mycolybas species exist. A review of the UPN collection found an apparent Mycolybas specimen from Tolima Department in central Colombia which did not seem to match the species known from the region.
