= Haematochiton elateroides =

Scientific classification
- Kingdom: Animalia
- Phylum: Arthropoda
- Clade: Pancrustacea
- Class: Insecta
- Order: Coleoptera
- Suborder: Polyphaga
- Infraorder: Cucujiformia
- Family: Erotylidae
- Genus: Haematochiton
- Species: H. elateroides

Binomial name
- Haematochiton elateroides Gorham, 1888

Synonyms
- Haematochiton bisculptum Casey, 1916

Species of beetle

Haematochiton elateroides is a small black-and-red species of pleasing fungus beetle (family Erotylidae) from Central and North America. Among its family, the genus Haematochiton is placed in subfamily Tritominae, or – in taxonomic arrangements that prefer a more comprehensive subfamily Erotylinae – in tribe Tritomini of the Erotylinae.

Whether the small and little-studied genus Haematochiton is distinct from its close relative, the hugely successful Mycotretus radiation, remains to be determined.

== Description ==
Haematochiton elateroides are small beetles, around one-fifth of an inch long and slightly less than half as wide (4.7-6.2 mm long and 2.2-2.9 mm wide) as adults. They are blackish overall except for the elytra, which are blood-red with small black tips. The body is elliptical, with a smoothly rounded head and an equally blunt wingtip; apart from tiny slight pin-prick-like punctures, the exoskeleton surface is smooth and shiny, with just a short fuzz of hair on the abdomen. On the sides of the pronotum and in lengthwise rows on the otherwise smooth elytra, these punctures are rather large, conspicuously elongated, and flat-bottomed; such punctuation is highly unusual among Erotylidae and – when observed with a magnifying glass – usually sufficient to identify this species.

The Arizonan population was at first described by Thomas L. Casey Jr. as a distinct species H.bisculptum, but the supposedly distinguishing traits were based on a hypercorrect reading of Gorham's description of H.elateroides. Comparison of Arizonan and Mexican specimens shows only some individual variation, with no consistent differences between the local populations. The presumed close relative H.cruentipennis from Brazil is very similar in coloration. However, its exoskeleton is more strongly punctured and it has clearly discernible small hairs all over, with the abdomen being particularly hairy. The lines along the leg attachments are well-developed and long in H.cruentipennis, which has also a somewhat more elongated and slender shape when seen from above.

Head
The head is elongate-oval and well visible from above; it lacks file-like structures for stridulation, and has no constriction between the rather small compound eyes. The individual ommatidia are also small (slightly bigger than in Triplax); H.elateroides is probably diurnal or crepuscular, but generally does not seem to rely on eyesight much. The punctures of the exoskeleton are sparse but fairly large and flat-bottomed at the base of the head, becoming smaller and denser towards the top. The "cheek" lobes are little developed and effectively invisible; the clypeus has a smooth front edge. The epistome is unmargined, due to the ocular striae not reaching beyond the antenna insertion points, and ends in an almost straight edge with a slight concave indentation; the mouth-cavity sides are flattened lobes. The antenna length is about two-thirds of the pronotal base width, with antenna segment 3 almost as long as the segments 4 and 5 together, and a large and gradually widening "club" forming the antenna tip.

The maxillary palps are curved, with a basal segment that is as long as segments 2 and 3 together, and an end segment that is rounded, barely half as long as it is wide, and lacks a brush; the maxillary lacinia have two incurved teeth at the tip. The labium has a moderately-sized and roughly square-shaped mentum with a three-pointed tip, and palps which end in a comparatively small hatchet-shaped segment with a strong bristle at the outer side and a sharply cut-off tip which bears a tiny brush.

Body
The prothorax is almost as wide at the base as the wings at their widest point. The pronotum is a blunt trapezoid, with the forward edge slightly shorter than the rear edge and slightly longer than the pronotum's midline; the sides curve towards the forward end, and the central area slopes to a slight hump between the midpoint and the forward edge. A thin margin runs around the pronotum except on the forward edge between the compound eyes, unlike in Mycotretus where the pronotal margin is continuous all around. Unlike in most Triplax, there are no conspicuous navel-shaped pores in the corners of the pronotum, but it is strewn with small and shallow punctures in the central area, with the outer third at each side having strikingly different elongated larger and flat-bottomed punctures. The tip of the prosternum is vertically evenly rounded and not compressed; the lengthwise lines at the center margin of the leg attachments run almost parallel, with a slight widening to the rear. On the meso- and metasternum, the lines between the leg attachments are at most a short basal trace, but usually entirely absent. The abdomen has only weak and shallow punctures bearing short hairs.

Males, but not females, have a conspicuous roughly punctated spot in the center of the underside of the first abdominal segment. The aedeagus of the male genitalia strikingly resembles that of Mycotretus nigromanicatus, in having a distinctive anterior end of the internal sac. The median lobe has a narrow membrane along the widely gaping opening of the median orifice. On the other hand, the female genitalia resemble various other Erotylidae in their details: The genital tube is overall shaped as in Ischyrus quadripunctatus, however the seminal receptacle lacks the conspicuously large extension seen in that species. There is one very long bristle in the middle of each stylus as in Aporotritoma pulchra. Tergite 8 is half again as wide as it is long, and resembles that of Triplax thoracica, with strongly sclerotized lines along the sides, and in the centerline near the tip a deep but narrow membranous indentation.

Wings and legs
The scutellum may be smooth or densely strewn with pronounced punctures; this varies individually or perhaps according to age. The elytra have a distinct margin at the base, which does not extend all the way to the tip; they are ornamented with regular lines of large, lengthwise elongated, and flat-bottomed punctuations, and smooth in between these. The attachments of each leg pair are neither particularly close or conspicuously far away. The legs' femora have a barely notable compression, are not much thickened, and bear a keel on their posterior edges. The tibiae are slender, slightly curved and a bit widened towards the ends. The first three segments of the tarsi are increasingly widened; segment 4 is reduced in size, attached to the upper centerside of segment 3, and rigidly joined to the base of segment 5 whose claw-bearing tip ends in three spikes.

== Distribution and ecology ==
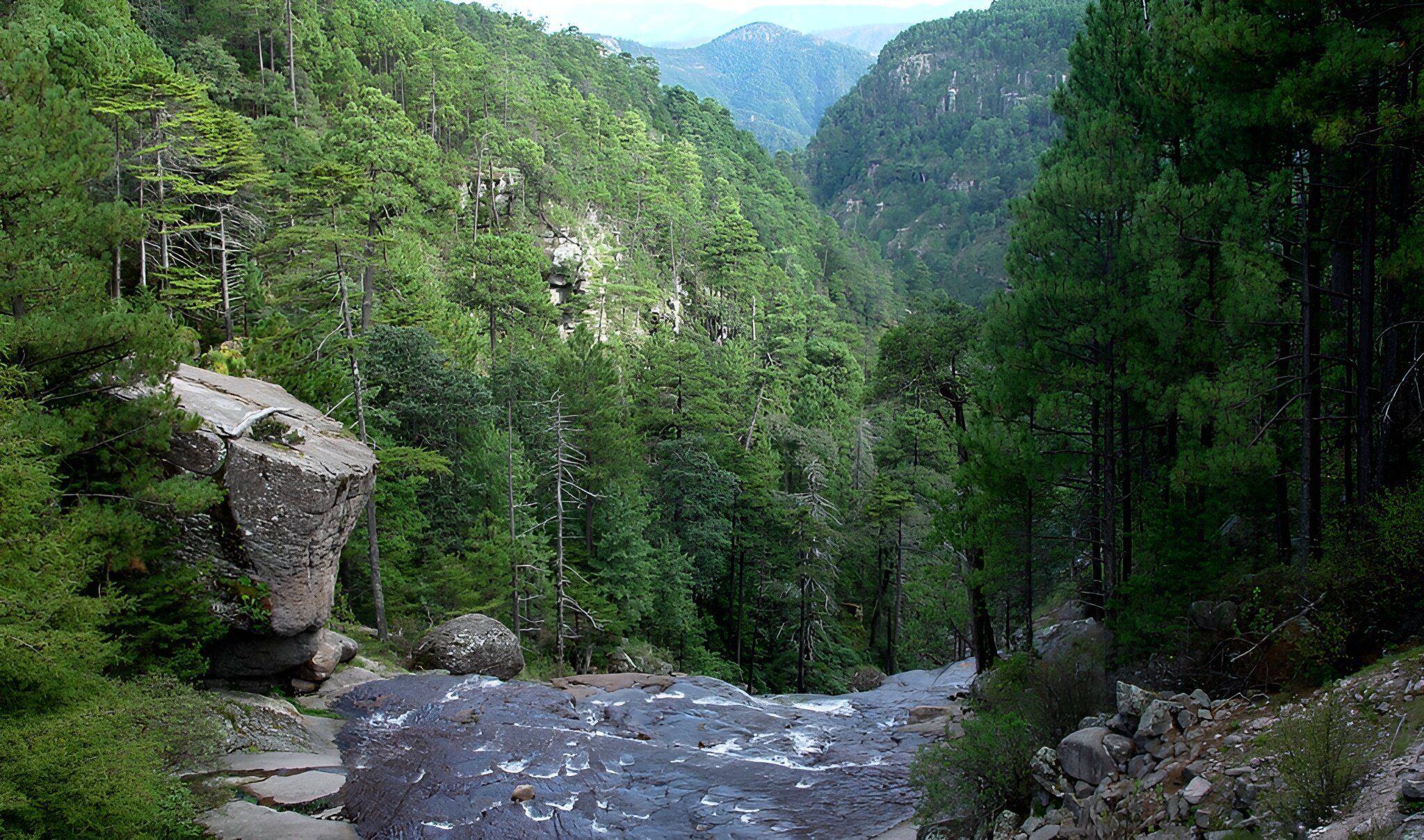
Montane pine forest near the type locality of H.elateroides, Pueblo Nuevo Municipality, Durango, Mexico

This beetle occurs in montane pine forests of northern Mexico and the adjacent US, where it has been reported from altitudes of 8,000-9,000 feet (2,500-3,000 m) AMSL. It was described by Henry S. Gorham in 1888 based on specimens from Pueblo Nuevo, Durango, in the Sierra Madre Occidental north of the Mexican Plateau. US records are from Arizona, mostly from localities in the Chiricahua Mountains near the Mexican border such as Pine Creek and Rustler Park, but also from near the town of Patagonia to the west, as well as from Phoenix further to the northwest. Apparently, this species is restricted to the Sierra Madre Occidental pine–oak forests ecoregion and to patches of similar habitat on the moisture-catching mountains that rise at the boundary of the Chihuahuan and Sonoran Deserts, where they seem to be most abundant (but still quite scarce, or maybe hard to find) around July.

Rustler Park has yielded most of the detailed ecological data on this species. One H.elateroides adult was found there by S.Taylor under pine bark near violet-pored bracket fungus (Trichaptum biforme of family Hymenochaetaceae in the order Hymenochaetales) and a polypore of the obsolete group "Aphyllophorales" – probably a species of order Polyporales, e.g. from genus Fomitopsis (family Fomitopsidaceae) or Fomes (family Polyporaceae). At another occasion in Rustler Park, three H.elateroides adults were extracted by F.H.Nishida from a fungus growing on a pine log and at that time assigned to genus Antrodia of the Fomitopsidaceae, but tentatively identified as "A." odora which is now in genus Tyromyces (as T.odorus) of the Incrustoporiaceae. There is also an older record from a "white resupinate polypore on conifer log" then tentatively assigned to the wastebasket genus "Poria", which was once used to indiscriminately unite any and all crust fungi regardless of their actual relationships.

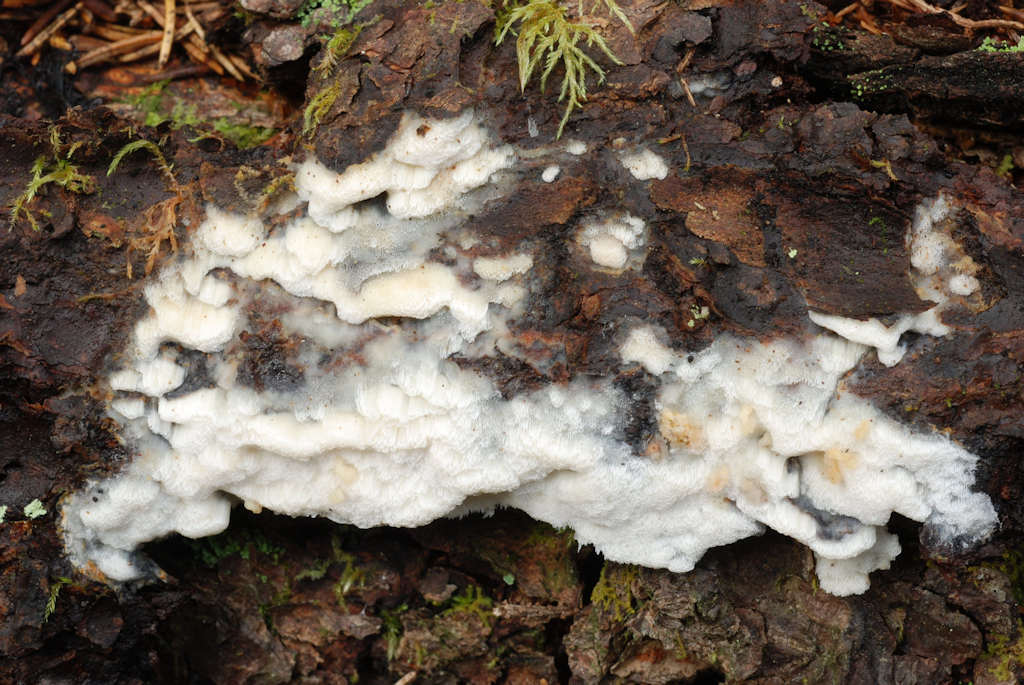
H.elateroides is suspected to feed on a white "crust fungus" growing on pine logs – possibly the species Tyromyces odorus shown here

The context of S.Taylor's record does not suggest that the T.biforme or the "Aphyllophorales" species (whatever its identity) were food for the beetle; more likely – also considering that H.elateroides have on other occasions been discovered "under bark of Pinus log[s]" (or similar) –, such records are of hibernating beetles which do not eat. The fungus in F.H.Nishida's record is almost certainly a suitable food species for H.elateroides adults (but maybe not the larvae, which in many Erotylidae have more discerning food preferences), but among the Polyporales, "A." odora and the "true" Antrodia are only moderately closely related, preventing any identification of the fungus in question beyond being visually similar to T.odorus. The "white resupinate [...] Poria?" was suggested to have been a T.odorus because this species was once placed in "Poria", but so were many actual Antrodia species, as well as the Irpicaceae Irpex lacteus which was recorded as occasional food of the pleasing fungus beetles Ischyrus quadripunctatus and perhaps also Tritoma b.biguttata. I.lacteus as well as many Antrodia sensu stricto (and related genera such as Skeletocutis, where T.odorus also was once placed) fit the description of a "white resupinate polypore" just as well as T.odorus does. Meanwhile, Tyromyces chioneus ("white cheese polypore"), closely related to T.odorus but a "shelf" instead of a "crust" fungus, is known to be a favored food of the pleasing fungus beetle Aporotritoma pulchra, which like T.biguttata (but unlike I.quadripunctatus) is suspected to belong to the closest relatives of Haematochiton.
