= Lopheros lineatus =

Scientific classification
- Kingdom: Animalia
- Phylum: Arthropoda
- Clade: Pancrustacea
- Class: Insecta
- Order: Coleoptera
- Suborder: Polyphaga
- Infraorder: Elateriformia
- Family: Lycidae
- Genus: Lopheros
- Species: L. lineatus

Binomial name
- Lopheros lineatus (Gorham, 1883)

Synonyms
- Plateros lineatus Gorham, 1883

Net-winged beetle

Lopheros lineatus is a species of net-winged beetle, family Lycidae. It is known from Central and Eastern Europe (Poland, Russia) and from East Asia (Russian Far East, Japan, Northeast China). It uses aposematic coloration to avoid attacks from predators.
