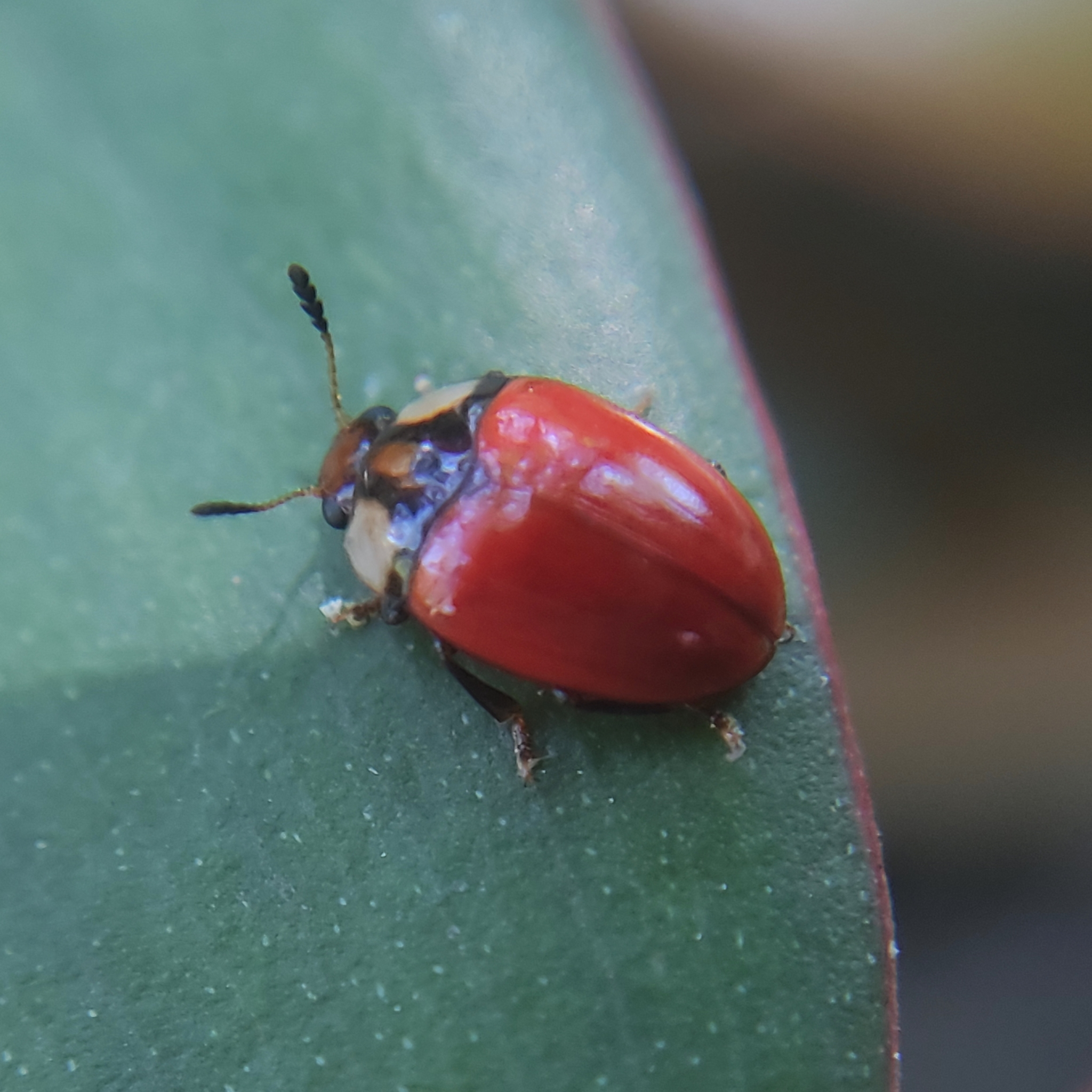
- Adult Mycomystes apicalis

Scientific classification
- Kingdom: Animalia
- Phylum: Arthropoda
- Clade: Pancrustacea
- Class: Insecta
- Order: Coleoptera
- Suborder: Polyphaga
- Infraorder: Cucujiformia
- Family: Erotylidae
- Subfamily: Erotylinae
- Tribe: Tritomini
- Genus: Mycomystes; Gorham, 1888

Type species
- Mycomystes ferrugineus Gorham, 1888

Synonyms
- Mycocystes (lapsus)

= Mycomystes =

Genus of beetles

Mycomystes is a genus of neotropical pleasing fungus beetles (family Erotylidae). The adults are smallish, oval, and have conspicuously clubbed antennae, like most of their relatives. They are colored mostly dark orange to chestnut-brown, with additional black in some species. Among its family, this genus is placed in subfamily Tritominae, or – in taxonomic arrangements that prefer a more comprehensive subfamily Erotylinae – in tribe Tritomini of the Erotylinae.

== Species ==
Until the early 21st century, this genus only included the type species M.ferrugineus. More recently, several species of the closely related Mycotretus were moved here. For a few other beetles presently in Mycotretus (e.g. M. adalioides), their affiliations remain to be clarified; these, too, might eventually be revealed as Mycomystes.

As of 2023, 7 species are placed in Mycomystes:

- Mycomystes apicalis (Lacordaire, 1842) (= M.coccinelloides, M.corallipennis, M.gemmula, M.gentilis, M.nigroterminatus, M.pulicarius)
- Mycomystes coccineus (Lacordaire, 1842) (= M.sanguinosus, M.unicolor)
- Mycomystes ferrugineus Gorham, 1888
- Mycomystes fuscitarsis (Lacordaire, 1842)
- Mycomystes melanophthalmus (Duponchel, 1825) (= M.cinctellus, M.discoidalis)
- Mycomystes nigriventris Pecci-Maddalena & Lopes-Andrade, 2020
- Mycomystes peruvianus (Kirsch, 1876)
