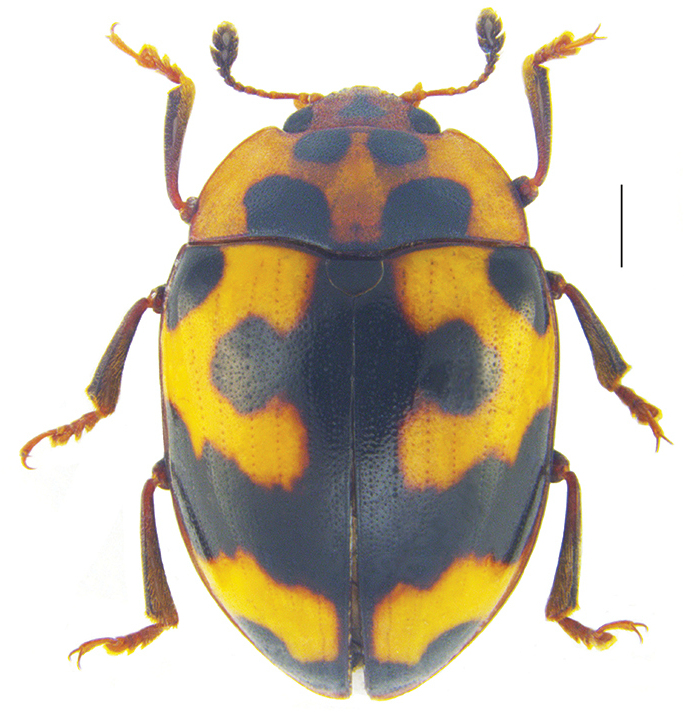
- Cyrtomorphus connexus Scale bar = 1 mm

Scientific classification
- Kingdom: Animalia
- Phylum: Arthropoda
- Clade: Pancrustacea
- Class: Insecta
- Order: Coleoptera
- Suborder: Polyphaga
- Infraorder: Cucujiformia
- Family: Erotylidae
- Subfamily: Erotylinae
- Genus: Cyrtomorphus; Lacordaire, 1842

Type species
- Cyrtomorphus pantherinus Lacordaire, 1876

= Cyrtomorphus =

Genus of beetles

Cyrtomorphus is a genus of pleasing fungus beetles (insects in the family Erotylidae). Species are found in Far East Asia, from Taiwan and southern China to the Sunda Shelf. There is also a record from eastern Africa and another from Pozuzo in Peru, which are suspect on biogeographical grounds, because pleasing fungus beetle genera are usually restricted to a single coherent landmass. These small and roundish beetles strikingly resemble ladybeetles even more than numerous other pleasing fungus beetles do. This genus is placed in subfamily Tritominae, or – in taxonomic arrangements that prefer a more comprehensive subfamily Erotylinae – in tribe Tritomini of the Erotylinae.

== Species ==
- Cyrtomorphus albiclava Arrow, 1926
- Cyrtomorphus angustior Crotch, 1876 (= C.histeroides)
- Cyrtomorphus bengalensis (Guérin-Méneville, 1841)
- Cyrtomorphus chinensis Mader, 1955
- Cyrtomorphus circulus Kuhnt, 1910
- Cyrtomorphus clypeoniger Delkeskamp, 1965 (tentatively placed here)
- Cyrtomorphus connexus Gorham, 1896
- Cyrtomorphus corallipennis Gorham, 1896
- Cyrtomorphus craticularis Gorham, 1896
- Cyrtomorphus curtus Gorham, 1896
- Cyrtomorphus divisus Arrow, 1926
- Cyrtomorphus duodecimmaculatus Araki, 1941
- Cyrtomorphus dux Arrow, 1925
- Cyrtomorphus duxoides Mader, 1955
- Cyrtomorphus elegans Arrow, 1925
- Cyrtomorphus helleri Deelder, 1942
- Cyrtomorphus inversus Crotch, 1876
- Cyrtomorphus jucundus Arrow, 1926
- Cyrtomorphus laetus Deelder, 1942
- Cyrtomorphus liui Chûjô, 1967
- Cyrtomorphus mimicus Arrow, 1926
- Cyrtomorphus minimus Kuhnt, 1910
- Cyrtomorphus moultoni Kuhnt, 1910
- Cyrtomorphus nigripes Arrow, 1925 (= C.curtus Arrow, 1921 nec Gorham, 1896)
- Cyrtomorphus nitiduloides (Lacordaire, 1842)
- Cyrtomorphus pantherinus Lacordaire, 1876
- Cyrtomorphus pardalinus Gorham, 1896
- Cyrtomorphus pusillus Kirsch, 1876 (tentatively placed here)
- Cyrtomorphus rufobrunneus Jia & Li, 2019
- Cyrtomorphus sexmaculatus Kuhnt, 1910
- Cyrtomorphus spenceri Chûjô, 1968
- Cyrtomorphus tonkineus Arrow, 1928
- Cyrtomorphus vethi Deelder, 1942
- Cyrtomorphus vietnamensis Chûjô, 1968
- Cyrtomorphus wallacei Crotch, 1876
- Cyrtomorphus yunnanus Mader, 1937

"C." clavulus is now in Pseudotritoma, while the supposed "C."quadrimaculatus turned out to be the same species as Spondotriplax endomychoides – the type species of Spondotriplax –, which consequently was renamed S.quadrimaculatus.
