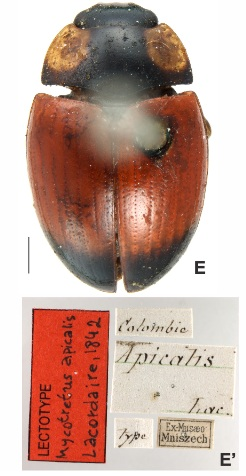

Scientific classification
- Kingdom: Animalia
- Phylum: Arthropoda
- Clade: Pancrustacea
- Class: Insecta
- Order: Coleoptera
- Suborder: Polyphaga
- Infraorder: Cucujiformia
- Family: Erotylidae
- Genus: Mycomystes
- Species: M. apicalis

Binomial name
- Mycomystes apicalis (Lacordaire, 1842)

Synonyms
- Mycotretus apicalis Lacordaire, 1842; Mycotretus gemmula Lacordaire, 1842; Mycotretus gentilis Lacordaire, 1842; Mycotretus nigroterminatus Lacordaire, 1842; Mycotretus pulicarius Lacordaire, 1842; Mycotretus coccinelloides Taschenberg, 1870; Mycotretus corallipennis Crotch, 1876

= Mycomystes apicalis =

Species of beetle

Mycomystes apicalis is a species of beetle of the Erotylidae family. This species is found in southeastern Brazil, Colombia, Peru, Venezuela and Argentina.
