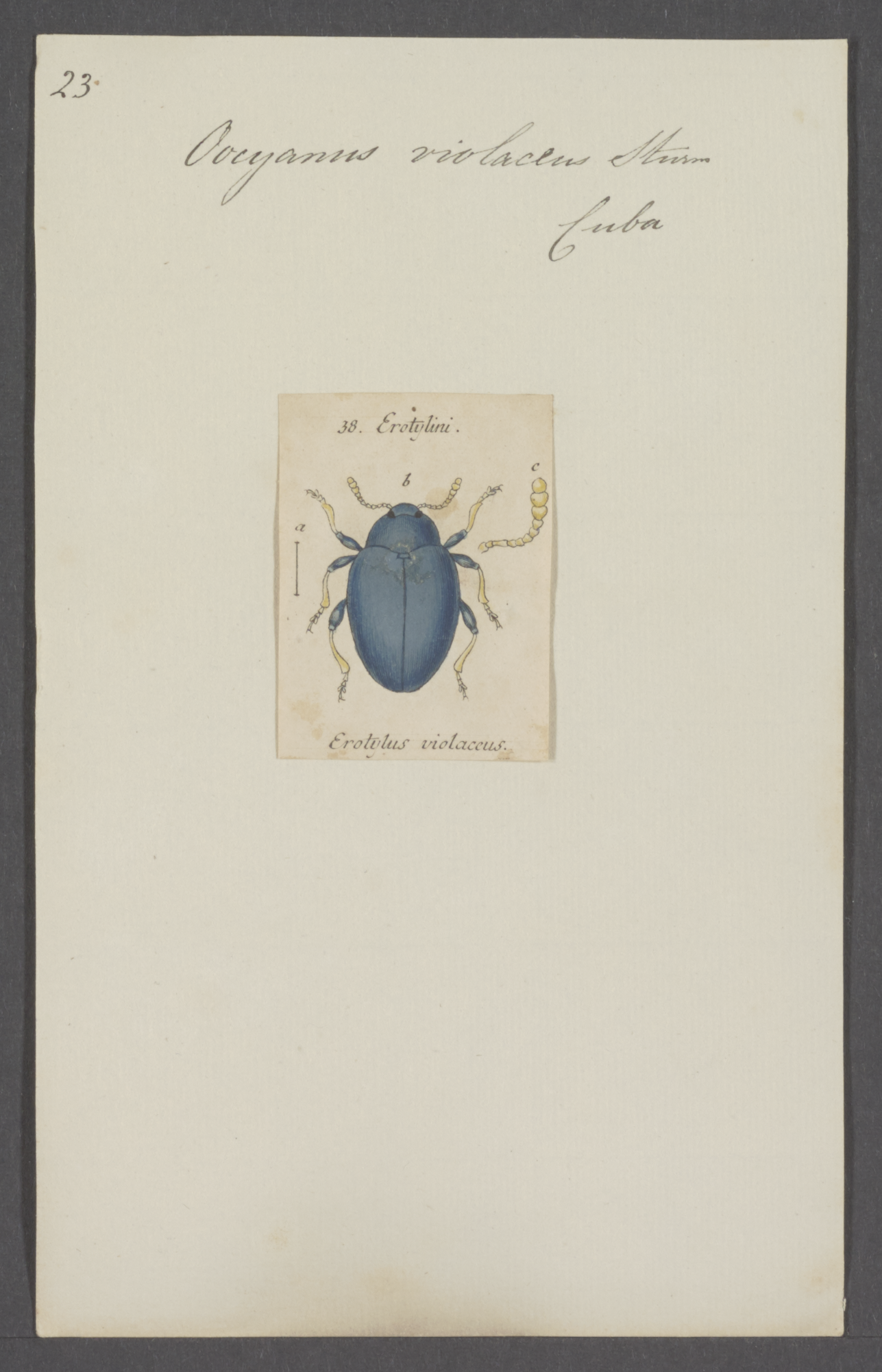
- Illustration of "Erotylus violaceus", a junior synonym of Epytus cyaneus

Scientific classification
- Kingdom: Animalia
- Phylum: Arthropoda
- Clade: Pancrustacea
- Class: Insecta
- Order: Coleoptera
- Suborder: Polyphaga
- Infraorder: Cucujiformia
- Family: Erotylidae
- Genus: Epytus; Dejean, 1836
- Species: E. cyaneus

Binomial name
- Epytus cyaneus (Duponchel, 1825)

Synonyms
- Genus-level: Epytus Crotch, 1876 (junior homonym); Oocyanus Hope, 1841; Species-level: see text

= Epytus =

Epytus is a now-monotypic genus of pleasing fungus beetles (family Erotylidae). It used to contain about half a dozen species, but except for Epytus cyaneus from Cuba, they were all moved to the newly erected genus Notaepytus in 2009. Epytus is placed in the subfamily Tritominae (="Triplacinae"), or – in taxonomic arrangements that prefer a more comprehensive subfamily Erotylinae – in tribe Tritomini of the Erotylinae.

From its close relatives, E. cyaneus can be distinguished by a combination of anatomical features: the forward angles of the pronotum being expanded towards the head, a triangular mentum, the absence of a bead-like protuberance on the femur margin, and an angular and squareish 9th segment of the antenna. But even without detailed examination, its color pattern – blue with mostly yellow legs and antennae – is unique among its family.

== Description ==
E. cyaneus is mid-sized by standards of its family, i.e. a small beetle of 4.5-7.0 mm body length and 2.5-4.0 mm body width as adults. Egg-shaped when seen from above, its carapace is mostly greyish blue, and while seeming smooth is in fact covered in microscopic reticulated relief that makes it matte, not shiny as in many other Erotylidae. The tibiae and tarsi of the legs as well as the labrum and the antennae are a contrasting and vivid light yellow which becomes almost white on the antenna "clubs" (segments IX-XI). The male genitalia have a flagellum with a pointed tip and a slight swelling immediately below.

Head
The compound eyes have large ommatidia but are fairly small, each just one-third of the width of the head between them. The punctures on top of the head are half as wide as one ommatidium, and each puncture is separated by twice an ommatidium's diameter from the next. The ocular groove reaches to the bases of the antennae, the clypeus has a smooth edge, and the "cheek" lobes below the compound eyes are shortened and blunt.

The antennae are attached next to the base of the pronotum, and their segments are characteristically shaped as follows: Segment 2 is as long as it is wide, while segment 3 is three times as long as wide; segments 4 to 7 are each half as long and equally wide as segment 3. The clubbed antenna tip starts at segment 8, whose outer end is markedly angular, as is the following segment 9, which is roughly as wide as it is long, but with a flaring end that gives it a trapezoidal shape. Segments 10 and 11 are similar in length to segment 9; while segment 10 is also similar in shape, segment 11 is knob-like.

As for the mouthparts, the mentum has triangular plate of equal length and base-width. The maxillary lacinia bear no teeth, and the end segment of the maxillary palps forms a symmetrical triangle, slightly more than half as long as it is wide. In the labial palps, the end segment is an asymmetrical triangle of similar size and proportions to the last maxillary palp segment, but expanded medially and slightly shorter; this is in marked contrast to many Ischyrus species whose labial palps end with a more narrow segment than the maxillary palps. The mouth-cavity sides are flattened lobes.

Thorax and wings
The pronotum is fairly flat, with forward angles that project towards the head; its sides are not strongly curved. Behind each compound eye, there is a small bead on the pronotal margin, which is otherwise unadorned. It is densely covered in punctures less than half as wide as one ommatidium each, and separated by about one ommatidium's width. At each side of the pronotal base, there is a dense cluster of a few larger punctures (about the width of an ommatidium). The prosternum is 2.5 times as long as its with between the foreleg attachments, flat, with a shallowly concave base; it is not pinched on its forward edge, but features one small bead. Its surface is unpunctured, and an unbroken line surrounds each coxal attachment.

The mesosternum is half again as wide as it is long, truncated at the base, and has some sparse fine punctures; the mesosternal line has no conspicuous gaps around the coxal attachment, and diverges between the coxal attachments towards the forward end. The scutellum is pentagonal, 0.75 times as long as it is wide. E. cyaneus has a fully functional set of two pairs of wings. The hardened forward ones (elytra) have no bead at the base, and a row of faint punctures at the side edge of the epipleural fold which appears as a line at a casual glance. Similar lines of punctures, each half as wide as one ommatidium, run lengthwise on the elytra, with the punctures separated by more than one ommatidium diameter; between those punctured lines, the elytra have very fine punctures which are obscured by the microscopic surface structure and carry short thin bristles which are easily broken off.

On the metasternum, there are no coxal lines, but two lines meeting in the center, as well as a line along the forward edge is clearly visible and not covered by a flap of the mesosternum at its juncture with the metasternum; the metasternal surface is covered in scattered punctures, separated by 4 times their diameter, which are obscured by the pronounced microscopic relief.

Abdomen and legs
The abdomen has scattered fine punctures, also much obscured by the carapace relief; only on the hindward end of the bellyplates, the punctures are larger and more conspicuous. The femora of the mid- and hindlegs are round in cross-section, and lack the sharp-edged beady margin on the posterior margin that is found in some related taxa. The first three segments of the tarsi are increasingly widened.

== Ecology ==
Almost nothing is known about the ecology and behavior of E. cyaneus, and how its differs from its relatives in these regards. While most related species most eat polypores (shelf fungi) as usual for Erotylidae, the Tritominae/Tritomini are noted for containing numerous lineages with more diverse eating habits.

E. cyaneus specimens are known from a fairly small number of localities, but these are from all over Cuba, and while the species was most often reported from the lowlands, it was also found up to at least 3.000 ft (~1 km) AMSL in the mountains between Imías and Baracoa near the eastern tip of Cuba, as well as in the eastern Escambray Mountains near its south-central coast which are of similar height. Most localities are within or near the Cuban moist forests/Cuban pine forests ecoregions. Adults can be found around the year, but reports seem more frequent from June–August, when the first period of intense summer rains is followed by about 5-10 drier (but still hot and humid) weeks. One specimen was found at the end of May in association with a rotting "almácigo" tree that had toppled over a river; in the Caribbean, the name "almácigo" refers to Bursera simaruba, and the circumstances suggest the tree in question was large and/or old and housed plenty of wood-decaying fungi. No eggs, larvae or pupae seem to have ever been reported for this species, and like with feeding habits, in regard to larval ecology the group containing Epytus is also markedly diverse.

Collections of E. cyaneus have occurred at least from the 1820s onwards (the 1825/1826 type specimens might have arrived with the same shipment of Cuban "curiosities", but are possibly lost). For example, the Naturalis museum had 4 specimens (but with no further data than "Cuba") at the 1941/42 revision. Even in the United States museums – whose access to Cuban wildlife became restricted after the 1950s – there are specimens dated at least up to 1989, and those for which exact data exist show a stable frequency of roughly one collection per decade.

== Former species ==
The following species were once placed in Epytus, usually on behalf of their legs having some yellowish hue. They differ in having black elytra with reddish-brown patterns, however, and have been moved into a new genus Notaepytus together with some more recently discovered relatives – the new genus name literally means "spotted Epytus", but is also a pun on "not-Epytus":

- Notaepytus flavitarsis (Lacordaire, 1842)
- Notaepytus fulvitarsis (Lacordaire, 1842)
- Notaepytus haitensis (Curran, 1944)
- Notaepytus modestus (Olivier, 1807)
- Notaepytus tarsalis (Lacordaire, 1842)
- Notaepytus tarsatus (Lacordaire, 1842) (formerly in E.tarsalis)

== Species synonyms ==
The species Epytus cyaneus was first described as Erotylus cyaneus by Philogène Duponchel in 1825, based on a specimen in the collection of Pierre Dejean. Various 19th-century authors referred to it as "Epytus azureus", but that name was never validly established. More significantly, shortly after Duponchel, Jacob Sturm described the same species anew, as Erotylus violaceus, based on material from the collection of Heinrich and Henriette Escher-Zollikofer. While Dejean in his 1836 revision already correctly surmised that the two names referred to the same species (for which he established the new genus Epytus), Belgian entomologist Jean Théodore Lacordaire in his 1842 review of erotylid beetles gave a wrong citation for Duponchel's description.

Contemporary researchers who did not find the mis-cited species in Duponchel's work would then usually turn to Frederick Hope, the English specialist who in 1841 had published his own review of the pleasing fungus beetles – in French like that of Lacordaire, and competing with it in scientific discourse. Hope advocated the use of Sturm's name, placing the species in his newly established genus Oocyanus (loosely meaning "blue-egg" in reference to shape and color of the beetle), and ignoring Duponchel's description altogether. Most authors followed this treatment, and only with the review of Brazilian Moacyr Alvarenga in 1965, the original name of the species became widely used.

The obsolete synonyms of Epytus are:

- Eptyus cyaneus (lapsus)
- "Epyptus azureus" (nomen nudum, lapsus)
- "Epytus azureus" (nomen nudum)
- Epytus violaceus (Sturm, 1826)
- Erotylus cyaneus Duponchel, 1825
- Erotylus violaceus Sturm, 1826
- Ischyurus cyaneus (lapsus)
- Ischyrus violaceus (Sturm, 1826)
- Oocyanus cyaneus (Duponchel, 1825)
- Oocyanus violaceus (Sturm, 1826)
