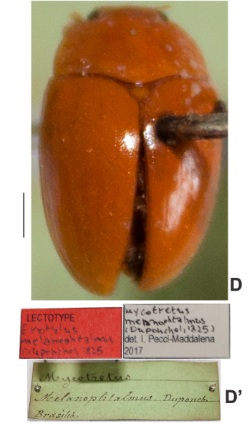

Scientific classification
- Kingdom: Animalia
- Phylum: Arthropoda
- Clade: Pancrustacea
- Class: Insecta
- Order: Coleoptera
- Suborder: Polyphaga
- Infraorder: Cucujiformia
- Family: Erotylidae
- Genus: Mycomystes
- Species: M. melanophthalmus

Binomial name
- Mycomystes melanophthalmus (Duponchel, 1825)

Synonyms
- Erotylus (Brachymerus) cinctellus Guérin-Méneville, 1841; Erotylus melanophthalmus Duponchel, 1825; Mycotretus cinctellus (Guérin-Méneville, 1841); Mycotretus discoidalis Taschenberg, 1870; Mycotretus melanophthalmus (Duponchel, 1825)

= Mycomystes melanophthalmus =

Species of beetle

Mycomystes melanophthalmus is a species of beetle of the Erotylidae family. This species is found from Central America to Argentina.
