= Mycolybas lucidus =

Scientific classification
- Kingdom: Animalia
- Phylum: Arthropoda
- Clade: Pancrustacea
- Class: Insecta
- Order: Coleoptera
- Suborder: Polyphaga
- Infraorder: Cucujiformia
- Family: Erotylidae
- Genus: Mycolybas
- Species: M. lucidus

Binomial name
- Mycolybas lucidus (Lacordaire, 1842)

Synonyms
- Lybas cruentatus Kirch, 1865; Lybas lucidus Lacordaire, 1842; Lybas melanocorynus Lacordaire, 1842; Mycolybas cruentatus (Kirch, 1865); Mycolybas egae Crotch, 1876; Mycolybas melanocorynus (Lacordaire, 1842); Mycomystes sachi Mader, 1938

Species of beetle

Mycolybas lucidus is a species of beetle of the Erotylidae family. This species is found in Honduras, Costa Rica, Panama, Colombia, Brazil, Peru, Paraguay and Argentina.

Adults reach a length of 5–9 mm and are around 4.75 mm wide. The colour of the elytra, head and pronotum is orange red or orange.

== Etymology ==
The species name is derived from Latin lucidus (meaning shiny) and refers to the shiny aspect of elytra and pronotum.
