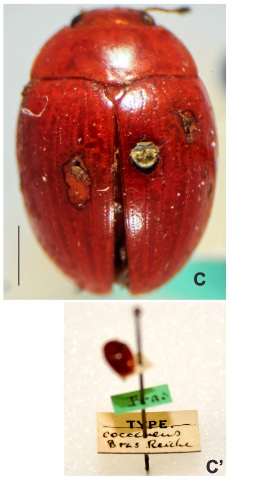

Scientific classification
- Kingdom: Animalia
- Phylum: Arthropoda
- Clade: Pancrustacea
- Class: Insecta
- Order: Coleoptera
- Suborder: Polyphaga
- Infraorder: Cucujiformia
- Family: Erotylidae
- Genus: Mycomystes
- Species: M. coccineus

Binomial name
- Mycomystes coccineus (Lacordaire, 1842)

Synonyms
- Lybas coccineus Lacordaire, 1842; Mycotretus coccineus (Lacordaire, 1842); Mycotretus unicolor Fauvel, 1860; Mycotretus sanguinosus Crotch, 1876

= Mycomystes coccineus =

Species of beetle

Mycomystes coccineus is a species of beetle of the Erotylidae family. This species is found in northern and southeastern Brazil, Colombia, Costa Rica, Guiana, French Guiana, Panama and Suriname.
