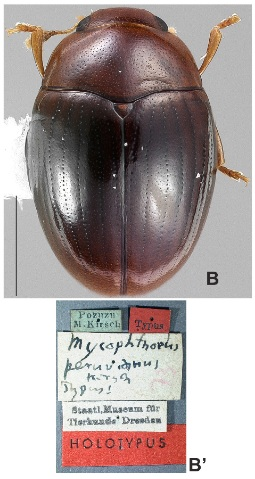

Scientific classification
- Kingdom: Animalia
- Phylum: Arthropoda
- Clade: Pancrustacea
- Class: Insecta
- Order: Coleoptera
- Suborder: Polyphaga
- Infraorder: Cucujiformia
- Family: Erotylidae
- Genus: Mycomystes
- Species: M. peruvianus

Binomial name
- Mycomystes peruvianus (Kirsch, 1876)

Synonyms
- Mycophtorus peruvianus Kirsch, 1876; Mycotretus peruvianus (Kirsch, 1876)

= Mycomystes peruvianus =

Species of beetle

Mycomystes peruvianus is a species of beetle of the Erotylidae family. This species is found in Peru.
