= Haematochiton =

Scientific classification
- Kingdom: Animalia
- Phylum: Arthropoda
- Clade: Pancrustacea
- Class: Insecta
- Order: Coleoptera
- Suborder: Polyphaga
- Infraorder: Cucujiformia
- Family: Erotylidae
- Tribe: Tritomini
- Genus: Haematochiton; Gorham, 1888

Type species
- Haematochiton elateroides Gorham, 1888

Synonyms
- Scaeother Gorham, 1888

Genus of beetles

Haematochiton is a small American genus of pleasing fungus beetles (family Erotylidae). Among its family, this genus is placed in subfamily Tritominae, or – in taxonomic arrangements that prefer a more comprehensive subfamily Erotylinae – in tribe Tritomini of the Erotylinae.

This genus unites a handful of species; two from the southern USA and northern Mexico which inhabit mountain pine woods, and two others from Brazil, at least one of which probably does not belong here; the monophyly and delimitation versus Mycotretus of Haematochiton remain to be established.

As late as the mid-20th century, nothing about the ecology of these beetles was known, except that they all inhabit woodland (as is usual for Erotylidae), but perhaps with a preference for montane forest.

== Description ==
Haematochiton are small beetles, less than 1 cm long as adults, and usually only about half that size. Their body is elliptical, sometimes with a slightly blunter head, fairly flat-backed, and around twice as long as it is wide. They are blackish, usually with some orange to red and brown colors on the elytra, legs, and the base of the antennae. Some species are dull, while others have a glossy sheen, and they are at most slightly hairy, though as with many Erotylidae the hair on the underside of the abdomen is longer and denser.

From Mycotretus they are most easily distinguished by color pattern and surface structure (punctuations, relief, etc), and the rear pronotal margin between the compound eyes, which in Mycotretus is continuous, and absent in Haematochiton. From Triplax the present genus can usually be distinguished by its narrower end segment of the maxillary palps and the lack of outsized navel-shaped pores in the corners of the pronotum. Some Tritoma are also similar in overall appearance, but their body shape is much more rotund.

Head
The head is elongate-oval and well visible from above; it generally seems to lack file-like structures for stridulation, and has no constriction between the rather small compound eyes. The individual ommatidia are also small (slightly bigger than in Triplax); Haematochiton is probably diurnal or crepuscular, but generally does not seem to rely on eyesight much. The "cheek" lobes are at most mid-sized but can be vestigial; the clypeus has a smooth front edge. The epistome is unmargined, due to the ocular striae at most barely reaching the antenna insertion points, and ends in an almost straight edge with a slight concave indentation; the mouth-cavity sides are flattened lobes. The antenna length is around two-thirds of the pronotal base width, with antenna segment 3 almost as long as the segments 4 and 5 together, and a "clubbed" antenna tip formed by the last 4-5 segments which gradually widen.

The maxillary palps are curved, with a basal segment that is at least as long as segments 2 and 3 together, and an end segment that is rounded, around half as long as it is wide, and does not carry a brush; the maxillary lacinia have two incurved teeth at the tip. The labium has a moderately-sized and roughly square-shaped mentum with a three-pointed tip, and palps which end in a comparatively small triangular hatchet-shaped segment with a strong bristle at the outer side and a sharply cut-off tip which bears a tiny brush.

Body
The prothorax is almost as wide at the base as the wings at their widest point. The pronotum is approximately square-shaped, with the forward edge about the same length as the rear edge or slightly shorter, and the mid-line length about the same as the rear width. Its sides curve towards the forward end, and a thin margin runs around the pronotum except on the forward edge between the compound eyes, unlike in Mycotretus where the pronotal margin is continuous all around. Unlike in most Triplax, there are no conspicuous navel-shaped pores in the corners of the pronotum. The tip of the prosternum is vertically evenly rounded and not compressed; the lengthwise lines at the center margin of the leg attachments run almost parallel, with a slight widening to the rear. On the meso- and metasternum, the lines between the leg attachments are scarcely visible or entirely absent.

Wings and legs
The elytra have a distinct margin at the base, which does not extend all the way to the tip, and are ornamented with regular lines of small punctuations. The scutellum is bluntly heart-shaped to pentagonal. The attachments of each leg pair are neither particularly close or conspicuously far away. The tibiae are slender, slightly curved, and not strongly widened towards the ends. The first three segments of the tarsi are increasingly widened; segment 4 is reduced in size, attached to the upper centerside of segment 3, and rigidly joined to the base of segment 5 whose claw-bearing tip ends in three spikes.

Males, but not females, have a conspicuous roughly punctated spot in the center of the underside of the first abdominal segment. The aedeagus of the male genitalia strikingly resembles that of certain Mycotretus, such as M.nigromanicatus, in having a distinctive anterior end of the internal sac. On the other hand, the female genitalia are more reminiscent of Triplax species such as T.thoracica, with an eighth tergite which has strongly sclerotized lines along the sides, and in the centerline near the tip a deep but narrow membranous indentation.

== Species ==
Species assigned to the genus Haematochiton are:

- Haematochiton carbonarius (Gorham, 1888) (= H.opacus; formerly in Scaeother)
- Haematochiton cruentipennis (Lacordaire, 1842) (formerly in Triplax)
- Haematochiton elateroides Gorham, 1888 (= H.bisculptum)

"H." maderi from southern Brazil, originally described in Triplax, has been moved to a new genus Xalpirta together with some Southern Cone species also formerly in Triplax. Xalpirta is also suspected to be a close relative of Mycotretus.
