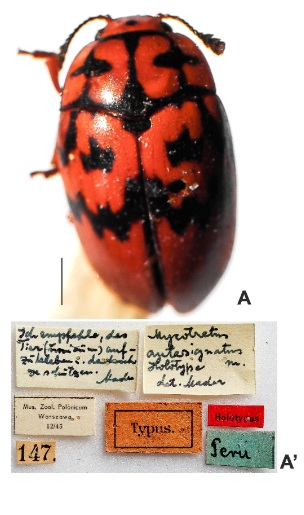

Scientific classification
- Kingdom: Animalia
- Phylum: Arthropoda
- Class: Insecta
- Order: Coleoptera
- Suborder: Polyphaga
- Infraorder: Cucujiformia
- Family: Erotylidae
- Genus: Mycolybas
- Species: M. antesignatus

Binomial name
- Mycolybas antesignatus (Mader, 1942)

Synonyms
- Mycotretus antesignatus Mader, 1942

= Mycolybas antesignatus =

Species of beetle

Mycolybas antesignatus is a species of beetle of the Erotylidae family. This species is found in Peru, northern and central-western Brazil.
