= Mycolybas atribruneicrus =

Scientific classification
- Domain: Eukaryota
- Kingdom: Animalia
- Phylum: Arthropoda
- Class: Insecta
- Order: Coleoptera
- Suborder: Polyphaga
- Infraorder: Cucujiformia
- Family: Erotylidae
- Genus: Mycolybas
- Species: M. atribruneicrus

Binomial name
- Mycolybas atribruneicrus Lopes, 2006

Synonyms
- Mycotretus antesignatus Mader, 1942

Species of beetle

Mycolybas atribruneicrus is a species of beetle of the Erotylidae family. This species is found in Colombia (Valle del Cauca), Bolivia (Cochabamba) and Brazil (São Paulo, Rio de Janeiro, Paraná).

Adults reach a length of about 8 mm. The colour of the elytra, head and pronotum ranges from scarlet orange to reddish orange or orange.

== Etymology ==
The species name is derived from Latin atribruneus (meaning darkish brown) and crus (meaning leg) and refers to the colour of the legs.
