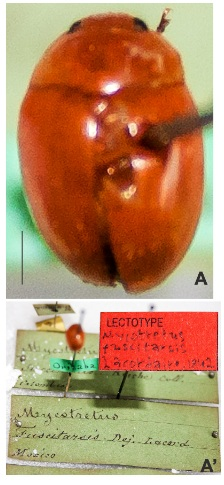

Scientific classification
- Kingdom: Animalia
- Phylum: Arthropoda
- Class: Insecta
- Order: Coleoptera
- Suborder: Polyphaga
- Infraorder: Cucujiformia
- Family: Erotylidae
- Genus: Mycomystes
- Species: M. fuscitarsis

Binomial name
- Mycomystes fuscitarsis (Lacordaire, 1842)

Synonyms
- Mycotretus fuscitarsis Lacordaire, 1842

= Mycomystes fuscitarsis =

Species of beetle

Mycomystes fuscitarsis is a species of beetle of the Erotylidae family. This species is found in Mexico.
