= Hirsutotriplax =

Scientific classification
- Kingdom: Animalia
- Phylum: Arthropoda
- Clade: Pancrustacea
- Class: Insecta
- Order: Coleoptera
- Suborder: Polyphaga
- Infraorder: Cucujiformia
- Family: Erotylidae
- Tribe: Tritomini
- Genus: Hirsutotriplax; Skelley, 1993#

Synonyms
- Hirsotriplax (lapsus)

Genus of beetles

Hirsutotriplax is a genus of pleasing fungus beetles in the family Erotylidae. There is one described species in Hirsutotriplax, H. mcclevei.
