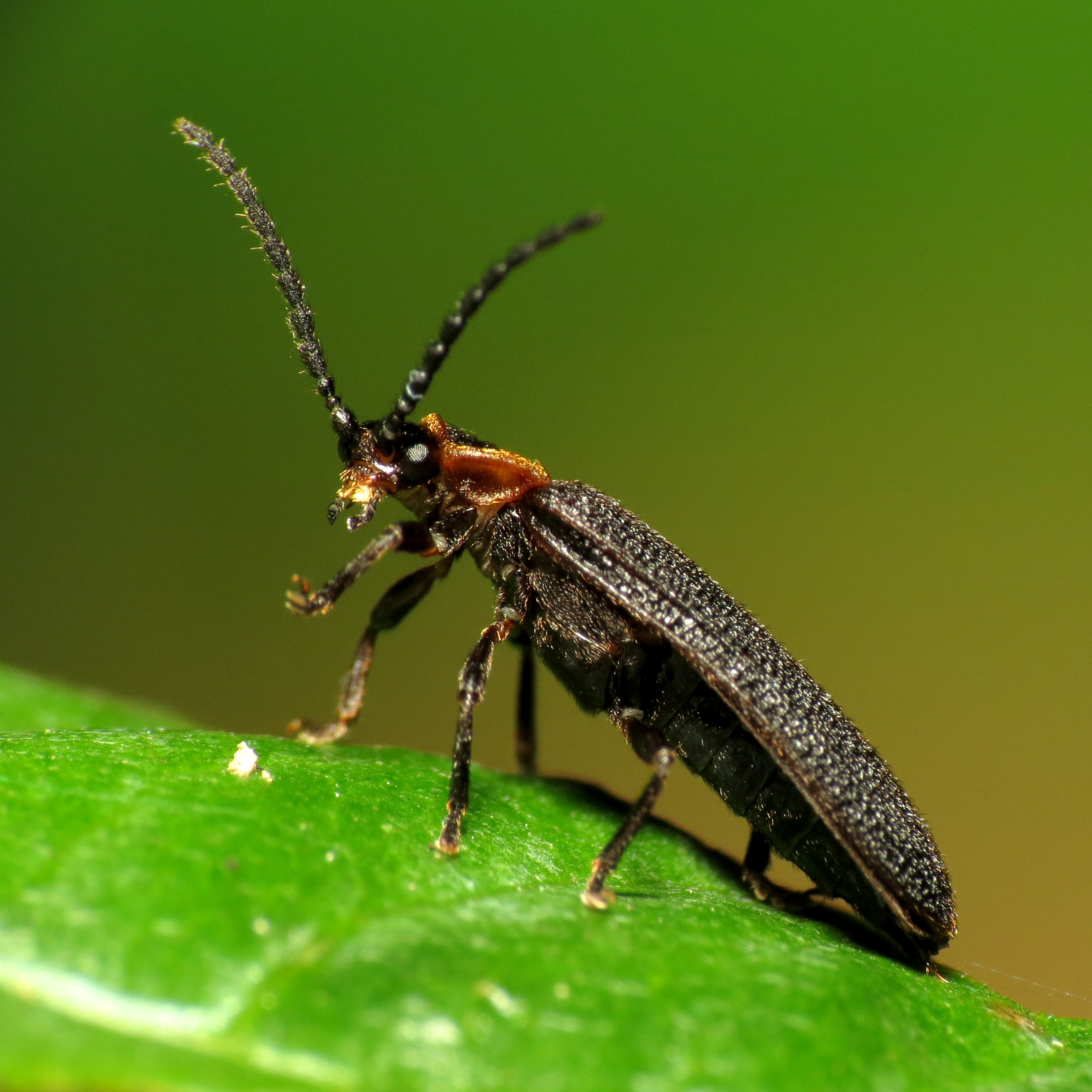

Scientific classification
- Domain: Eukaryota
- Kingdom: Animalia
- Phylum: Arthropoda
- Class: Insecta
- Order: Coleoptera
- Suborder: Polyphaga
- Infraorder: Elateriformia
- Family: Lycidae
- Genus: Lopheros
- Species: L. fraternus

Binomial name
- Lopheros fraternus (Randall, 1838)

= Lopheros fraternus =

Species of beetle

Lopheros fraternus is a species of net-winged beetle in the family Lycidae. It is found in North America.

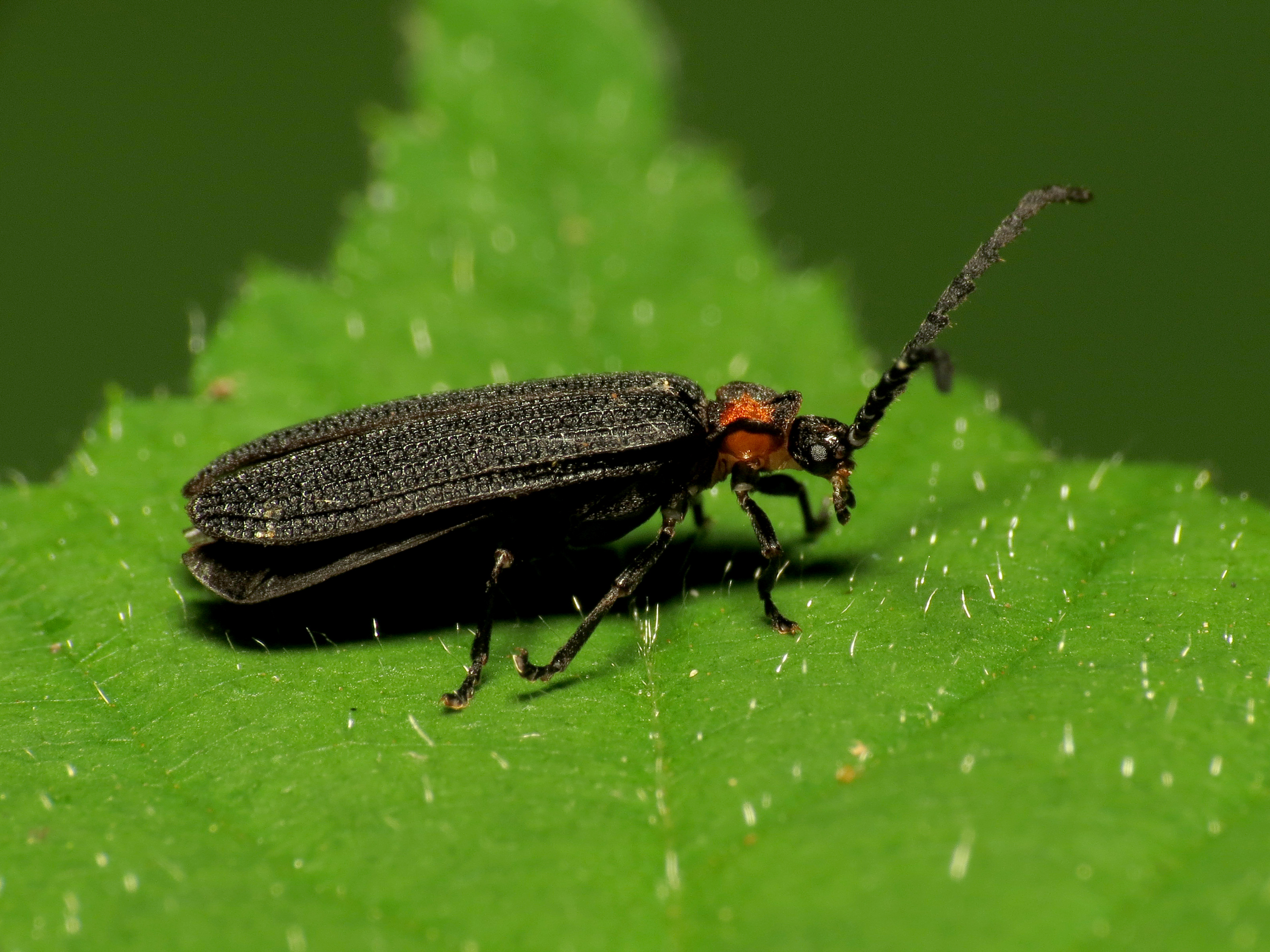
