= Mycolybas bicolorcrus =

Scientific classification
- Domain: Eukaryota
- Kingdom: Animalia
- Phylum: Arthropoda
- Class: Insecta
- Order: Coleoptera
- Suborder: Polyphaga
- Infraorder: Cucujiformia
- Family: Erotylidae
- Genus: Mycolybas
- Species: M. bicolorcrus

Binomial name
- Mycolybas bicolorcrus Lopes, 2006

Species of beetle

Mycolybas bicolorcrus is a species of beetle of the Erotylidae family. This species is found in Costa Rica, El Salvador, Honduras, Panama, Trinidad and Tobago and Venezuela.

Adults reach a length of about 7 mm. The colour of the elytra, head and pronotum ranges from scarlet orange to orange red, reddish orange or even orange

== Etymology ==
The species name is derived from Latin bicolor (meaning two colored) and crus (meaning leg) and refers the different colours of the tibiae and femora.
