= Mycolybas sanguinosus =

Scientific classification
- Kingdom: Animalia
- Phylum: Arthropoda
- Class: Insecta
- Order: Coleoptera
- Suborder: Polyphaga
- Infraorder: Cucujiformia
- Family: Erotylidae
- Genus: Mycolybas
- Species: M. sanguinosus

Binomial name
- Mycolybas sanguinosus (Motschulsky, 1858)

Synonyms
- Ischyrus sanguinosus Motschulsky, 1858

Species of beetle

Mycolybas sanguinosus is a species of beetle of the Erotylidae family. This species is found in Colombia.

Adults reach a length of about 5 mm. The colour of the elytra is orange red.

== Etymology ==
The species name is derived from Latin sanguinosus (meaning blood red,) and Greek pennis (meaning wing) and refers to the colour of the elytra.
