= Mycolybas coccineipennis =

Scientific classification
- Kingdom: Animalia
- Phylum: Arthropoda
- Class: Insecta
- Order: Coleoptera
- Suborder: Polyphaga
- Infraorder: Cucujiformia
- Family: Erotylidae
- Genus: Mycolybas
- Species: M. coccineipennis

Binomial name
- Mycolybas coccineipennis (Motschulsky, 1858)

Synonyms
- Ischyrus coccineipennis Motschulsky, 1858

Species of beetle

Mycolybas coccineipennis is a species of beetle of the Erotylidae family. This species is found in Central America.

Adults reach a length of 4–6 mm. The colour of the elytra is reddish orange, while the head and pronotum are dark brown.

== Etymology ==
The species name is derived from Latin coccineus (meaning scarlet) and Greek pennis (meaning wing) and refers to the colour of the elytra.
