= Mycolybas rufipennis =

Scientific classification
- Domain: Eukaryota
- Kingdom: Animalia
- Phylum: Arthropoda
- Class: Insecta
- Order: Coleoptera
- Suborder: Polyphaga
- Infraorder: Cucujiformia
- Family: Erotylidae
- Genus: Mycolybas
- Species: M. rufipennis

Binomial name
- Mycolybas rufipennis Guérin, 1956

Species of beetle

Mycolybas rufipennis is a species of beetle of the Erotylidae family. This species is found in Brazil (Amazonas).

Adults reach a length of about 8 mm. The colour of the elytra is ruby scarlet, while the head and pronotum are dark brown.

== Etymology ==
The species name is derived from Latin rufus (meaning reddish brown) and Greek pennis (meaning wing) and refers to the colour of the elytra.
