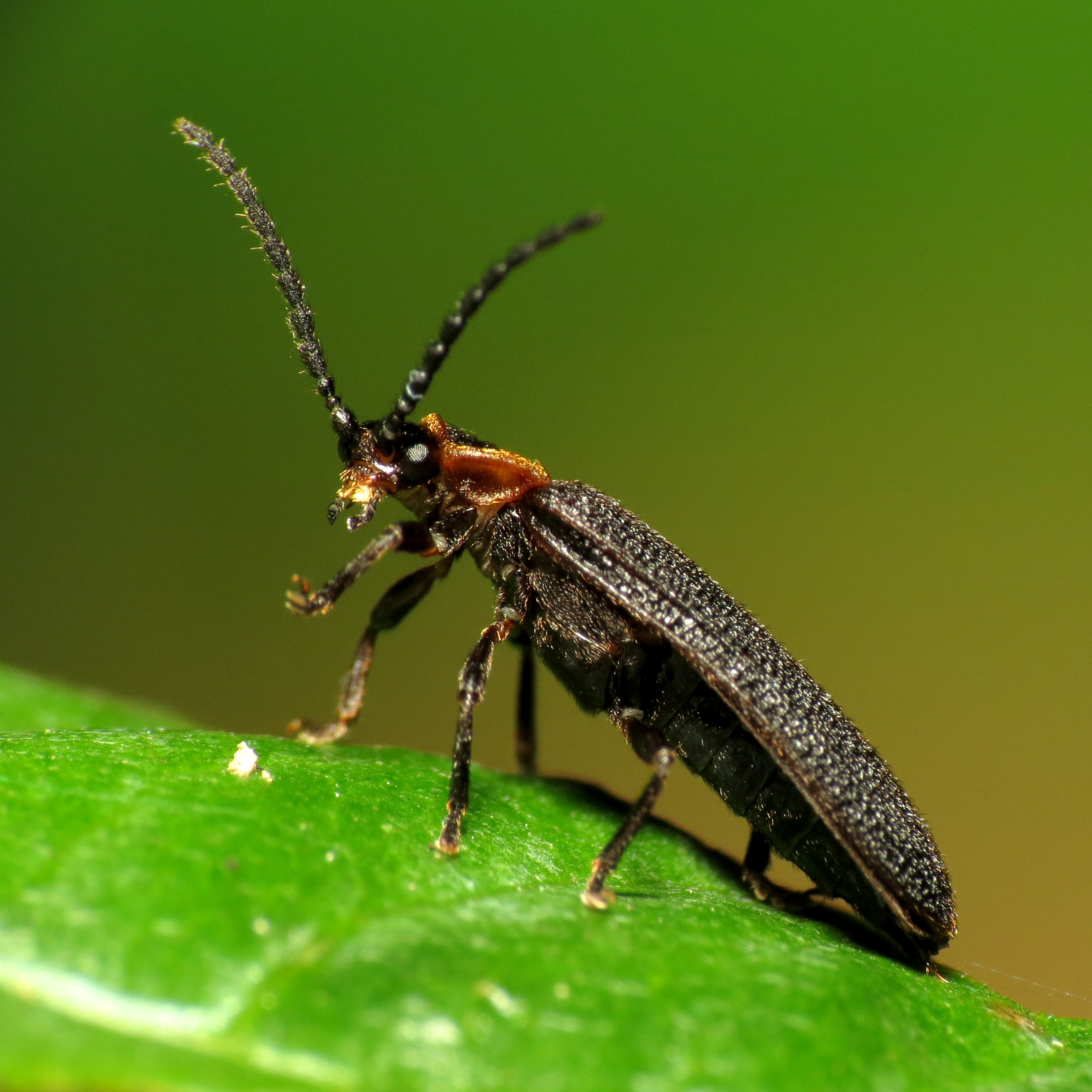
- Lopheros fraternus

Scientific classification
- Domain: Eukaryota
- Kingdom: Animalia
- Phylum: Arthropoda
- Class: Insecta
- Order: Coleoptera
- Suborder: Polyphaga
- Infraorder: Elateriformia
- Family: Lycidae
- Subfamily: Erotinae
- Genus: Lopheros; LeConte, 1881

= Lopheros =

Genus of beetles

Lopheros is a genus of net-winged beetles in the family Lycidae. There are about eight described species in Lopheros.

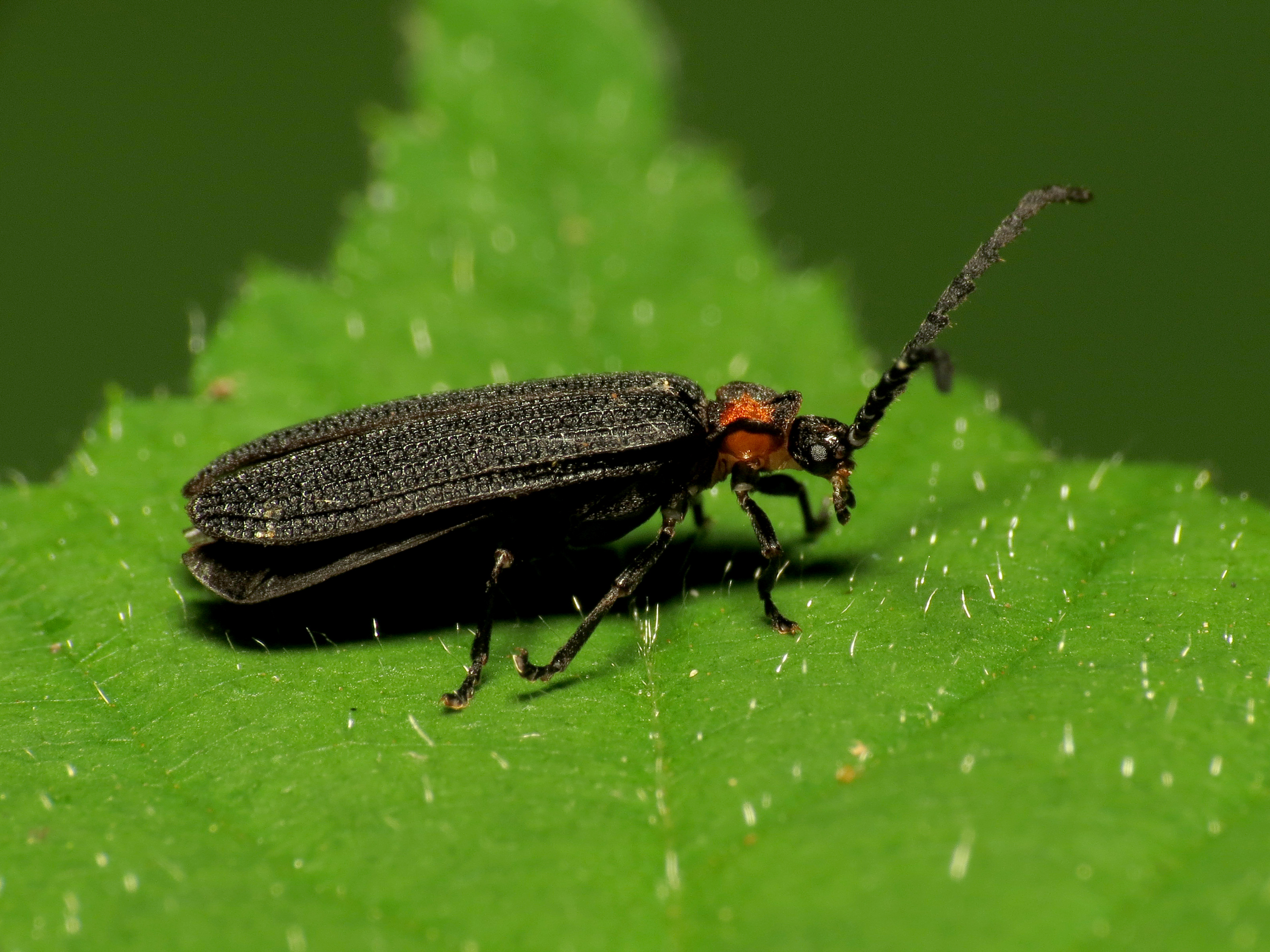
Lopheros fraternus

== Species ==
These eight species belong to the genus Lopheros:

- Lopheros crassipalpis
- Lopheros crenatus (Germar, 1824)
- Lopheros fraternus (Randall, 1838)
- Lopheros harmandi
- Lopheros konoi
- Lopheros lineatus (Gorham, 1883)
- Lopheros minimus
- Lopheros rubens (Gyllenhal, 1817)
