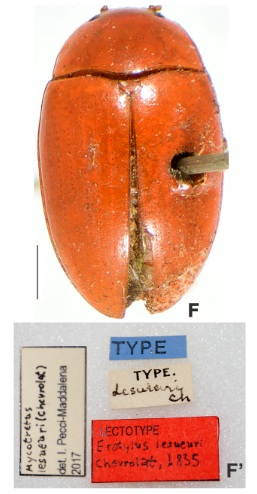

Scientific classification
- Kingdom: Animalia
- Phylum: Arthropoda
- Clade: Pancrustacea
- Class: Insecta
- Order: Coleoptera
- Suborder: Polyphaga
- Infraorder: Cucujiformia
- Family: Erotylidae
- Genus: Mycotretus
- Species: M. lesueuri

Binomial name
- Mycotretus lesueuri (Chevrolat, 1835)

Synonyms
- Erotylus lesueuri Chevrolat, 1835; Mycotretus savignyi Lacordaire, 1842

= Mycotretus lesueuri =

Species of beetle

Mycotretus lesueuri is a species of beetle of the Erotylidae family. This species is found in Mexico, El Salvador, Colombia and north Brazil.

In addition, there is collection material of this species (under its junior synonym M.savignyi) from Peru.
