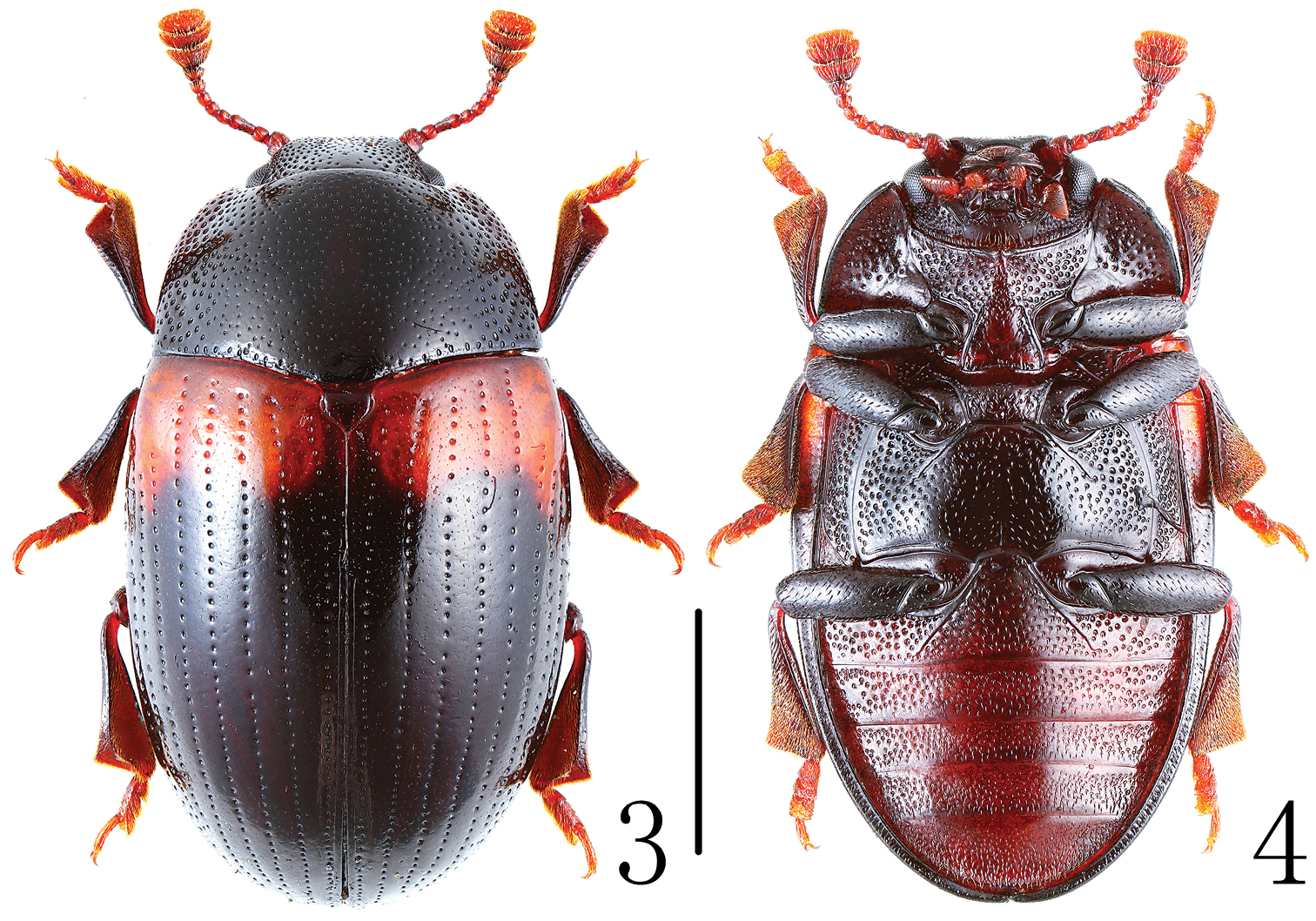
- Scelidopetalon biwenxuani, adult from above (left) and below

Scientific classification
- Kingdom: Animalia
- Phylum: Arthropoda
- Clade: Pancrustacea
- Class: Insecta
- Order: Coleoptera
- Suborder: Polyphaga
- Infraorder: Cucujiformia
- Family: Erotylidae
- Subfamily: Erotylinae
- Tribe: Tritomini; Curtis, 1834

Synonyms
- Cyrtotriplacini Chûjô, 1969; Renaniini Chûjô, 1941; Triplacinae Imhoff, 1856; Triplacini Streubel, 1839; Tritominae Curtis, 1834 (but see text)

= Tritomini =

Tribe of beetles

Tritomini is a tribe of pleasing fungus beetles (family Erotylidae) belonging to subfamily Erotylinae. If the Erotylinae are delimited more narrowly, the Tritomini are elevated to subfamily status as Tritominae. They occur almost globally, with more than 400 species in some three dozen genera; from North America, about 35 species in 9 genera are reported.

== Description ==
Tritomini (or Tritominae) are characterized by having "clubs" at the tips of the antennae, which are composed of 3-5 distinct and widened segments; the first segment of their curved maxillary palps is longer than segments 2 and 3 together, and the end segment is wider than long. The mentum of the labium is highly variable in shape and size, but generally not wider than high; the labial palps are more or less widened at the tip, which is usually hatchet-shaped and has one conspicuous strong bristle on the outer side, and the sides of the mouth cavity form flat lobes. On the prothorax, the holes for the foreleg attachments are fully closed; halfway between the leg attachments and the rear margin of the prothorax, there is a seam between prosternum and proepimera. The joint between meso- and metasternum has a broad double knob. On the 5-segmented tarsi, the first three segments are increasingly widened, while segment 4 is reduced, attached to the upper centerside of segment 3, and firmly joined to the base segment 5.

The lacinia of the maxilla may have two small curved teeth at the tip (e.g. in Triplax) which are sometimes so small and close together to appear as a single tooth; or it may lack such structures entirely (e.g. in Tritoma). Up to the mid-20th century, it was assumed that all members of this group lacked lacinia teeth. Upon the discovery of this distinction, the historical distinction between Tritomini (or Tritominae) and Triplacini (or Triplacinae) became again relevant, but whether the Triplax and Tritoma lineages should be considered distinct subtribes (or tribes, in case a subfamily Tritominae is recognized) is deferred until thorough phylogenetic studies of this group are available.

The coloration of pronotum and elytra is very diverse, with a few species even iridescent – otherwise quite rare in this family –, but eyespots are generally absent (though there are exceptions, e.g. in the vast Mycotretus assemblage).

== Systematics and ecology ==
The systematics of this tribe (or subfamily) are not fully resolved as of 2020. In addition to the relationship to the Erotylinae, the delimitation of the Tritomini versus the Xenoscelinae (or Cryptophilinae if the sensu stricto delimitation of pleasing fungus beetle subfamilies is applied), specifically the "Toramini", is not clear at all. One molecular phylogenetic study found the "Toramini" embedded within the "Tritominae", but the latter did not resolve as a clade but rather as an evolutionary grade. Since only the genus Toramus was sampled to represent the entire Xenoscelinae (or Cryptophilinae), these results require more thorough investigation.

Adults and larvae of these beetles presumably eat basidiomycete fungi, as is typical for Erotylidae, but details about their ecology are known only for a few Tritomini. Even so, this group is noted for some divergences from the usual ecology of pleasing fungus beetles: some genera (such as Mycotretus, Triplax and Tritoma) do not eat mainly polypores (shelf fungi), but prefer gilled Agaricales fungi or even a more varied diet. The larvae of some species are gregarious during feeding, and parental care has been recorded in Pselaphacus.

== Genera ==
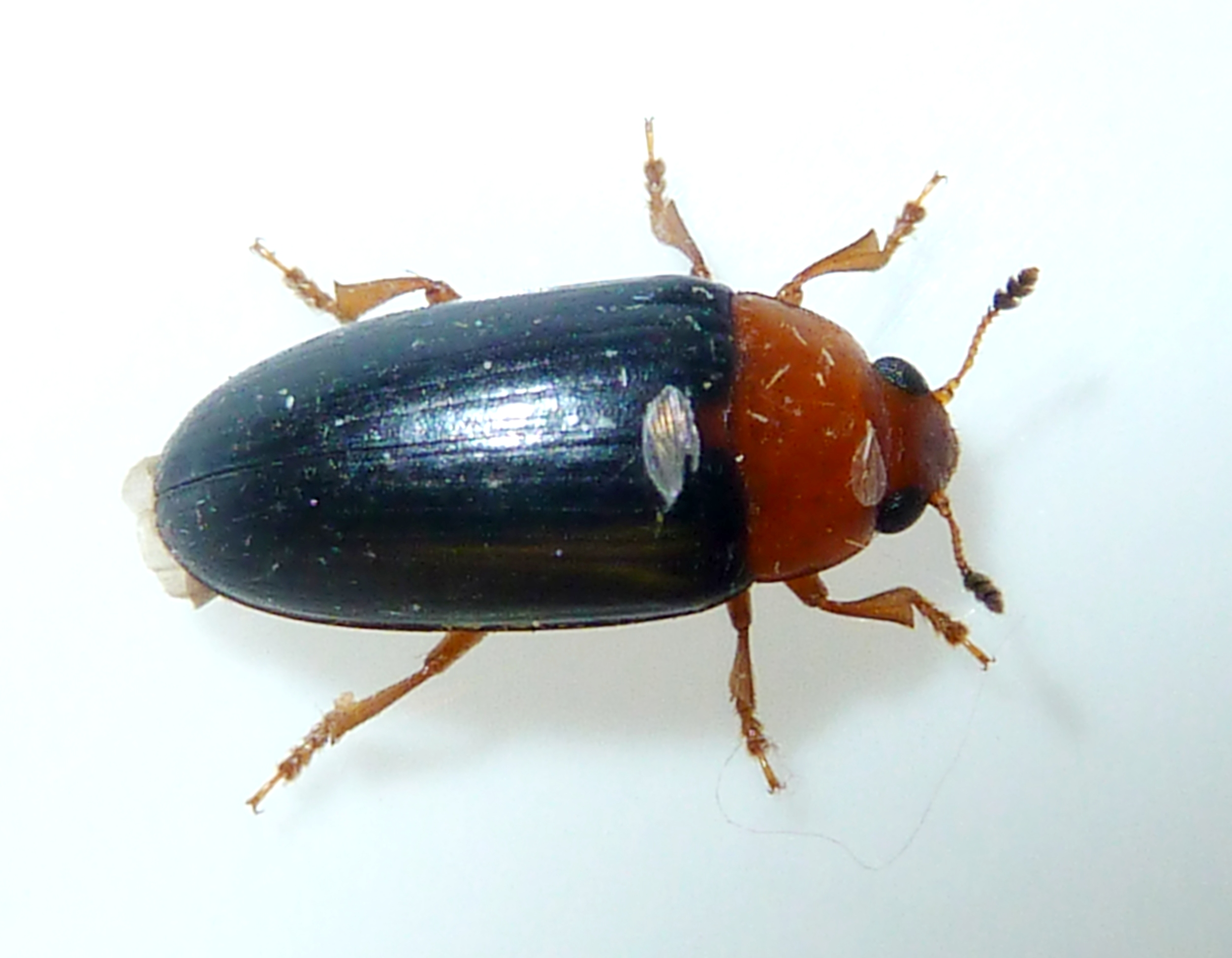
Unidentified Amblyopus from Pretoria, South Africa

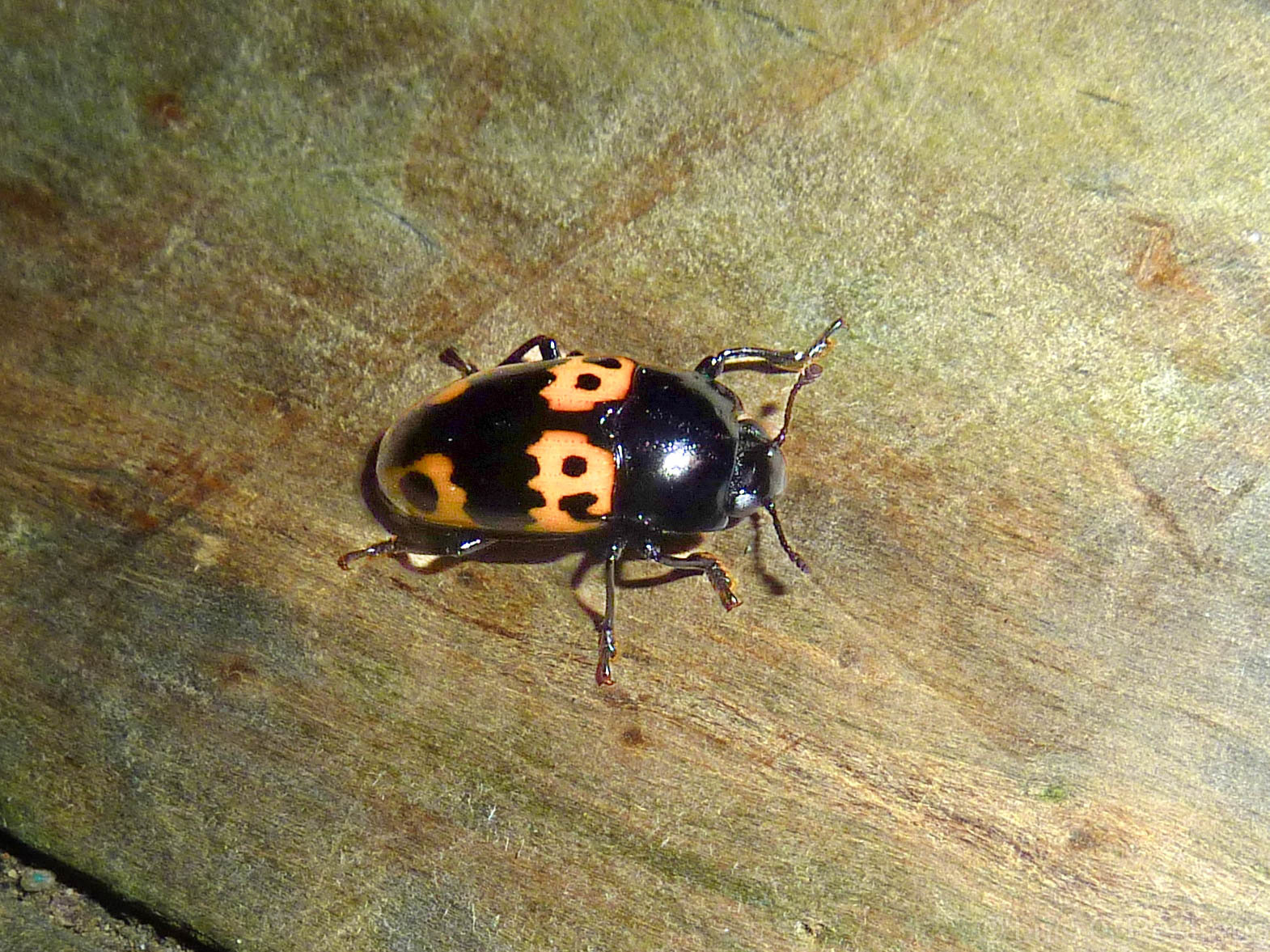
Pselaphacus nicaraguae near Nuquí, Colombia

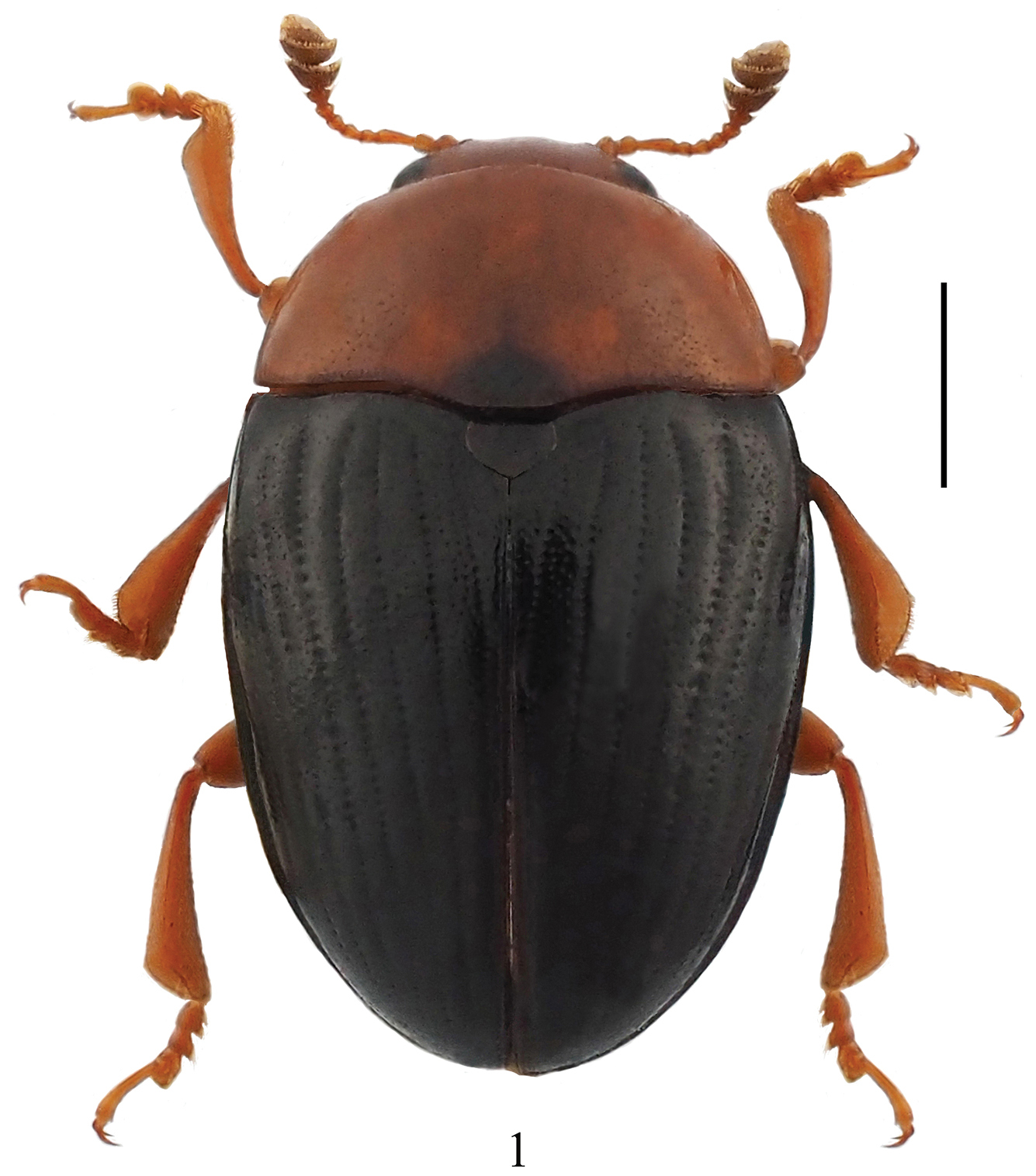
Pseudamblyopus sinicus

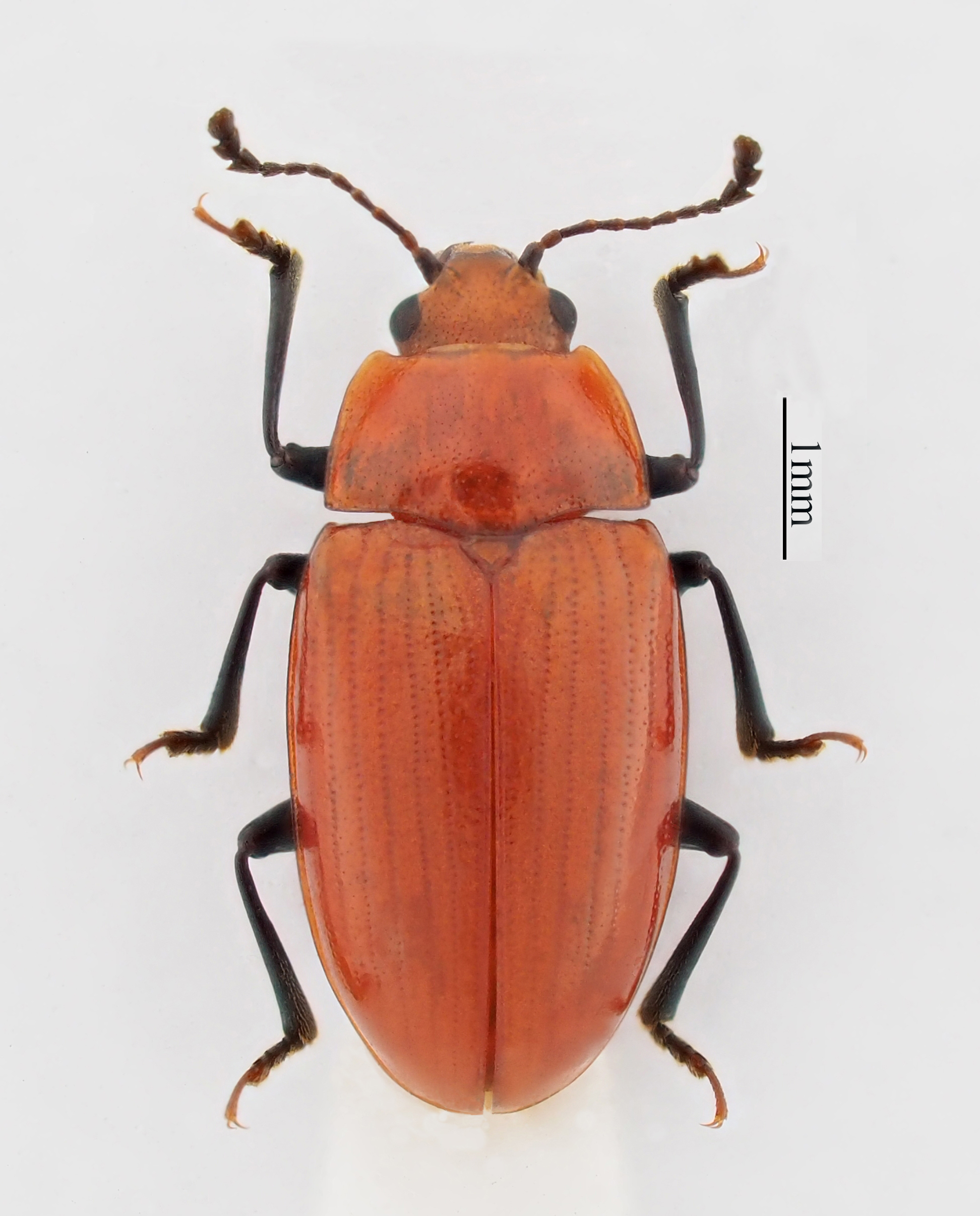
Rhodotritoma manipurica

These genera belong to the tribe Tritomini:

- Afrotriplax Delkeskamp, 1965
- Altisessor Skelley, 2009
- Amblyopus Lacordaire, 1842
- Amblyscelis Gorham, 1888
- Antoinettia Skelley, 2020 (formerly in Ischyrus)
- Aporotritoma Arrow, 1925 (sometimes in Tritoma)
- Bancous Pic (= Rhamphidera; formerly in Rhysopaussini)
- Callischyrus Crotch, 1876
- Camptotritoma Heller, 1920
- Chasmatodera Arrow, 1943
- Congocola Delkeskamp, 1962
- Cubyrus Skelley, 2009 (formerly in Ischyrus)
- Cyrtomorphus
- Cyrtomorphoides Heller, 1920
- Dactylotritoma Arrow, 1925
- Epytus (= Oocyanus)
- Eudaemonius Lewis, 1887 (= Eutriplax Lewis, 1887)
- Haematochiton (= Scaeother, may belong into Mycotretus)
- Helcocerus Arrow, 1944
- Hirsutotriplax
- Ischyrus Lacordaire, 1842 (= Micrischyrus)
- Isochyrus
- Kratopsis Delkeskamp, 1965
- Latosia Delkeskamp
- Libatomorpha Heller, 1920 (= Lybatomorpha)
- Lybanodes Gorham, 1888
- Lybas Lacordaire, 1842 (= Apolybas)
- Lybasia Delkeskamp, 1965
- Megischyrus (= Ischyrus Dejean, 1836 ("1837"; unavailable))
- Michyrus Skelley & Gasca-Álvarez, 2020
- Motrita Westwood, 1883 (formerly in Tritoma)
- Myceporthus Skelley & Powell, 2018 (formerly in Mycophtorus)
- Mycolybas
- Mycomystes (= Mycocystes (lapsus))
- Mycophtorus Lacordaire, 1842 (= Neomycotretus)
- Mycotretus
- Neotrimota Deelder, 1942
- Neotriplax Lewis, 1887
- Neotritoma Heller, 1920 (sometimes in Spondotriplax)
- Neoxestus Crotch, 1875
- Notaepytus Skelley, 2009 (formerly in Epytus)
- Ortitma Heller, 1920 (= Cyrtotriplax Gorham, 1888 non Crotch, 1873; formerly in Tritoma)
- Palaeolybas Crotch, 1875
- Phoxogenys Gorham, 1888
- Pselaphacus Percheron, 1835
- Pseudamblyopus Araki, 1941
- Pseudamblyscelis Philipp
- Pseudischyrus (may belong into Tritoma)
- Pseudolybas Gorham, 1888
- Pseudotritoma Gorham, 1888 (formerly in Tritoma)
- Renania Lewis, 1887
- Rhodotritoma Arrow, 1925
- Rhopalotriplax Deelder, 1942
- Rhopalotritoma Heller, 1920
- Rhynchotritoma Arrow 1920
- Rotitma Chûjô, 1969 (sometimes in Tritoma)
- Scelidopetalon Delkeskamp, 1957 (= Petaloscelis Gorham, 1896 nec Bergroth, 1893: preoccupied, Pycnogeusteria; may belong in Pseudamblyopus)
- Sphaerotritoma Arrow, 1943
- Spondotriplax Crotch, 1875 (= Hedista)
- Tetratriplax Lewis, 1887 (= Pselaphandra)
- Tetratritoma Arrow, 1925
- Titorma Heller, 1920
- Trichotritoma Arrow, 1936
- Trimota Heller, 1920 (formerly in Tritoma)
- Triplacidea Gorham, 1901 (formerly in Tritoma)
- Triplax (= Paratritoma, Tritomapara)
- Tritoma (= Cyrtotriplax Crotch, 1873)
- Tritomophasma Heller, 1920
- Tritomorpha M.T.Chûjô & M.Chûjô, 1987
- Xalpirta Skelley & Čekalović Kušcević, 2001 (formerly in Triplax)
- Xenotritoma Arrow, 1923
- Xestus Wollaston, 1864 (tentatively placed here)
- Xiphidiophora Delkeskamp, 1962
- Zythonia Westwood, 1874 (= Brechmotriplax, Lophocrotaphus)

The genus Pantocryptus, formerly placed here, has turned out to be misidentified sap beetles of genus Cychramptodes.
