= Henry Stephen Gorham =

English entomologist (1839-1920)

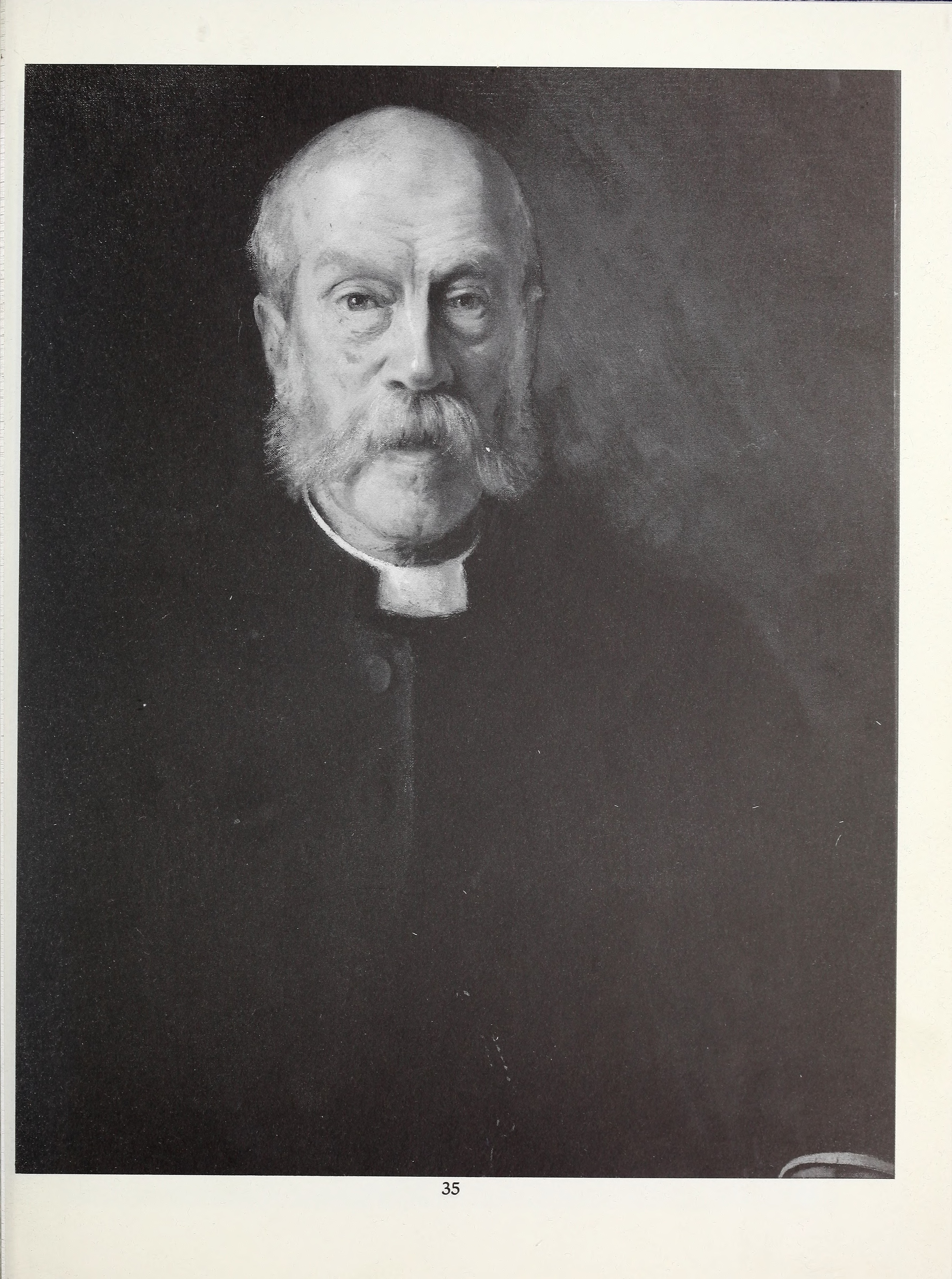
Portrait of Henry Stephen Gorham by Hely Augustus Morton Smith (c. 1905)

Henry Stephen Gorham FRES(1839–1920) was an English entomologist who specialised in Coleoptera.

He was a Fellow of the Royal Entomological Society from 1885, a Fellow of the Zoological Society of London from 1881; and a Member of the Societé Entomologique de France from 1887.

He wrote very many short scientific papers and in Biologia Centrali-Americana. Insecta. Coleoptera. Vol. VII. Erotylidae, Endomychidae, and Coccinellidae. VII. London. 276 pp., 13plates. 1887-1899 edited by Osbert Salvin and Frederick DuCane Godman.
