= Ischyrus dunedinensis =

Scientific classification
- Kingdom: Animalia
- Phylum: Arthropoda
- Clade: Pancrustacea
- Class: Insecta
- Order: Coleoptera
- Suborder: Polyphaga
- Infraorder: Cucujiformia
- Family: Erotylidae
- Genus: Ischyrus
- Species: I. dunedinensis

Binomial name
- Ischyrus dunedinensis Blatchley, 1917

Synonyms
- Ischyrus tripunctatus Blatchley, 1917 (non Crotch, 1873: preoccupied); Micrischyrus dunedinensis (Blatchley, 1917)

Species of beetle

Ischyrus dunedinensis, the three-spotted pleasing fungus beetle, is a species of pleasing fungus beetle (family Erotylidae) endemic to the southeastern USA. Within its family, this beetle is placed in subfamily Tritominae, or – in taxonomic arrangements that prefer a more comprehensive subfamily Erotylinae – in tribe Tritomini of the Erotylinae.

Originally described in 1917 as "Ischyrus tripunctatus" due to its three-spotted pronotum pattern, this scientific name had already been used for a distinct but likewise three-spotted Nicaraguan member of its genus in 1873. Thus, the North American species' name was soon changed to I.dunedinensis, in reference to the type locality Dunedin, Florida. It is one of the small species which were placed in genus Micrischyrus until the resolution of the complicated nomenclatural history of Ischyrus.

Among the North American Ischyrus, this species is more closely related to the widespread four-spotted pleasing fungus beetle (I.quadripunctatus) than to the little-known I.aleator. The Mexican I.frontalis, however, seems to be even more closely related to the present species.

== Description ==
I.dunedinensis adults are smallish by standards of its family, about 0.2-0.3 in (5.15-7.35 mm) long and 0.095-0.13 in (2.4-3.25 mm) wide. Their elytra have roughly parallel sides for most of their basal half; overall, the body has an elongated egg-shape when seen from above, slightly more blunt in front, widest at the well-rounded "shoulders", and with almost parallel sides. From the side, they are rather low-slung and have a smoothly curving profile. Their exoskeleton is covered in a microscopic reticulated relief that gives them a silky sheen that under a microscope looks like the crinkled pattern of leather or human skin.

The adults' dark-and-light color pattern is composed of patches of black and pale orange. The underside and head are dark, except for an elongated orange spot between each compound eye and the top of the head, which neither touch each other or the epistome; in some individuals the spots are brownish and less distinct. The legs and palps are reddish-brown, while the antennae is brown, with the "club" at the tip black, never pale as it in some related genera. The most obvious distinguishing mark which separates I.dunedinensis from similar species is the dark pattern on the light pronotum – three round or slightly oval spots arranged in a crosswise row, about equally distant from each other and the pronotal edge, and with the central spot about half the pronotal length in diameter and twice as wide as the two outer spots. The elytra have a light-colored main surface, with a black band at the base that runs through the scutellum, extends one-fourth tipwards, and is often broken up into a large rectangular or square central and two narrow and somewhat triangular "shoulder" spots, which widen rearwards and almost touch the elytra bases and margins. The pronotum has a thin black border on the central 60% of its rear margin, adjacent to the black central spot of the elytral bases. The central wing-base spot is connected by a black mid-line (when the elytra are folded in resting position) to a large angular black blotch which begins at the midpoint of the elytra, and extends rearwards to the last quarter or fifth of the elytra; a short black centerline may connect it to the wingtip. The outer edge of the elytra is light-colored, but immediately adjacent there is a long black stripe which starts slightly headwards of the elytral half-length and runs as far towards the wingtip as the main body of the large central blotch; in some individuals, the black side-stripes are connected to the central blotch, forming a jagged but continuous band similar to the pattern of I.quadripunctatus. Unlike in that species, however, the wingtips of I.dunedinensis are never margined in black. The Mexican I.frontalis is extremely similar to I.dunedinensis, but its black markings are less extensive; in particular the head is entirely reddish except for a black sopt at the back.

Head
The head has loosely-strewn coarse punctations, long antennae (by Erotylidae standards), and prominent but not outsized compound eyes with large ommatidia. The ocular grooves barely reach the rear rim of the antennae bases, the epistome is thus unmargined; the "cheek" lobes below the compound eyes are small, round, and sharp-edged. The top of the head is somewhat narrowed at the rear of the compound eyes, becoming wider to the front. At least the males probably have file-like structures that, when the beetle wiggles its head, rub against the chitin and produce a squeaking sound, but compared to those of some other pleasing fungus beetles these structures might not be very sophisticated, and are possibly short or vestigial. The clypeus has no margin along the smooth front edge, and the mouth-cavity sides are flattened lobes.

The antennae are a bit more than half as long as the pronotum is wide at the base; their attachments do not reach to the base of the pronotum, and their segments are characteristically shaped as follows: Segment 2 is rounded and barely longer than wide, while segment 3 is three times as long as wide and longer than segments 4 and 5 together. Segments 4 to 8 are all longer than wide, and form the "stalk" of the antenna. The eighth segment is angled at the tipward end and barely wider than the seventh; the clubbed portion of the antenna tip only starts at segment 9, which is somewhat wider than it is long. The symmetrical antennal club is covered in fine hairs, and a bit less than half as wide as it is long.

As for the mouthparts, the mentum has a broadly triangular plate. The galea and lacinia of the maxilla resemble those of Pseudischyrus and Tritoma; there are no teeth at the lacinia tip. The end segment of the maxillary palps has a wide hatchet-shaped form; it is a bit wider than long. Its size is relatively modest, barely larger than the end segment of the labial palps. The latter is asymmetrical, expanded medially, and about as long as it is wide; it is markedly thinner than the maxillary palp end segments, with a cut-off tip that carries a tiny brush.

Body
The sides of the pronotum are strongly curved towards the compound eyes, starting about one-third headwards from the base, which is more than half again as wide as the headward edge, giving the pronotum a well-rounded trapeze-shape. Behind each compound eye, there is a small bead-like margin on the pronotal edge, which is otherwise unadorned, and entirely missing between the eyes and on the entire rear side. At each side of the pronotal base's centerline, there is a small cluster of a few larger punctures in a shallow dimple, and in the pronotum corners there are small and insoncspicuous pores; the rest of the pronotum is sprinkled with fairly large punctuations which become denser at the sides. The prosternum has a pinched centerline, and has a thin bead-like margin on the forward edge, which is compressed into a pitcher-like lip. At the inner edge of the coxae there are strong short straight impressed lines which barely diverge to the rear. The mesosternum is half again as wide as it is long, and slightly wavy at the posterior margin; it has some mid-sized punctuations. The distance from meso- to metacoxae is about twice the distance between the mesocoxae. On the well-developed metasternum; the sternal line is medially faint. The metacoxal lines are shortened, reaching barely halfway between the rear edges of the coxae and the metasternal sides. The intercoxal process of the abdomen is somewhat widened and slightly curved, and unlike in some other Erotylidae, males and females do not have conspicuously different external abdominal structures.

The male genitalia in general layout resemble those of many species in the closely related genera Triplax and Tritoma, and even more those of I.quadripunctatus. The median strut of the aedeagus is barely longer than the median lobe. The latter is notably curved, blunt at the tip, and slightly constricted by a dimple just below the tip; the lateral lobes of the tegmen are half again as long as they are wide. The long internal sac protrudes anteriorly through the median hole with almost the same length as the median lobe, and has an anterior muscle attachment but no noticeable sclerotized structures. The ejaculatory duct is long, strongly sclerotized and enclosed; near the proximal end of the internal sac the ejaculatory duct is abruptly upturned at a 90° angle, quite unlike in I.quadripunctatus but somewhat similar to the layout in I.frontalis. The flagellum is hair-like, long and narrow, and the tegminal arms have lobes on the back. The female genitalia in overall appearance are somewhat similar to those of Cypherotylus and Megalodacne, which among the Erotylidae are not closely related to Ischyrus however. A striking difference to those two is the large seminal receptacle of Ischyrus females, similar to that of the more closely related Aporotritoma pulchra in having a swollen, much sclerotized and almost straight (not U-shaped as in I.quadripunctatus) extension.

Wings and legs
I.dunedinensis has a fully functional set of two pairs of wings, with the tough elytra covering the parchment-like foldable hindwings at rest. The elytra at their widest point are wider than the prothorax where it meets the elytra; they are unmargined even at the base, and have regular rows of small punctuations which extend lengthwise for almost the entire elytra, with finer punctuations loosely scattered in between those lines. The scutellum is bluntly pentagonal. The attachments of each leg pair are neither particularly close or conspicuously far away. The femora of the mid- and hindlegs are angular in cross-section, and have a conspicuous sharp-edged bead on the posterior margin. The tibiae are weakly curved and do not widen conspicuously towards the tips. The first three segments of the tarsi are increasingly widened; segment 4 is reduced, attached to the upper centerside of segment 3, and rigidly joined to segment 5.

== Ecology ==
Very little is known about the habitat and habits of this beetle, which for almost 70 years was only known from the holotype, an adult of undetermined sex, specimen 92 in the Blatchley collection at Purdue University. It was found on May 2, 1916, at Dunedin on the central Gulf of Mexico coast of the Florida Peninsula.

A review of Ischyrus specimens in 1986 located dozens of additional specimens in museum and private collections; they had been collected at least since the 1950s but remained unstudied and unidentified until the review. Most notable is the record from Georgia, where one I.dunedinensis was attracted to a light at Camp Cornelia of Okefenokee National Wildlife Refuge in the night of June 13/14, 1981, by researchers C.L.Smith and S.N.Brown; this specimen is now in the University of Georgia arthropod collection. In Florida, specimens have been reported from most parts of the state, but it might be rare or absent in the Everglades.

Most records are from May to July; at the Archbold Biological Station in south-central Florida they were collected up to September however. Their large-faceted eyes also suggest that they are nocturnal animals, and adults are indeed occasionally attracted to UV- and other light traps at night, and have been found in small numbers in suction traps at dusk or dawn. More rarely, they are caught with insect nets while flying, and they have been collected with Malaise traps in considerable numbers (e.g. 27 – more than half the specimens known in 1989 – at Archbold Biological Station).

The holotype was recovered from between the leaves of a spreading airplant (Tillandsia utriculata), but the species almost certainly eats fungi as do its relatives. As with almost all Ischyrus, nothing specific is known so far about the eating habits of I.dunedinensis; the better-studied I.quadripunctatus likes soft-fleshed polypore Agaricomycetes (shelf and crust fungi), in particular the white rot polypore Oxyporus latemarginatus of family Schizoporaceae from order Hymenochaetales, less commonly the oak conk (Fuscoporia gilva) of the related family Hymenochaetaceae, and there is also one record from the crust fungus Irpex lacteus of family Irpicaceae from order Polyporales.
