= Chiasmus (disambiguation) =

Chiasmus is the reversal of grammatical structures in successive phrases, with its application on a more complex or larger scale described as Chiastic structure.

Chiasmus may also refer to:

- Chiasmus (cipher), a German government block cypher
- Chiasmus (leafhopper), a genus of leafhopper
- Another name for Chiasmetes, a genus of South American beetle

== See also ==
- Chiastic structure
