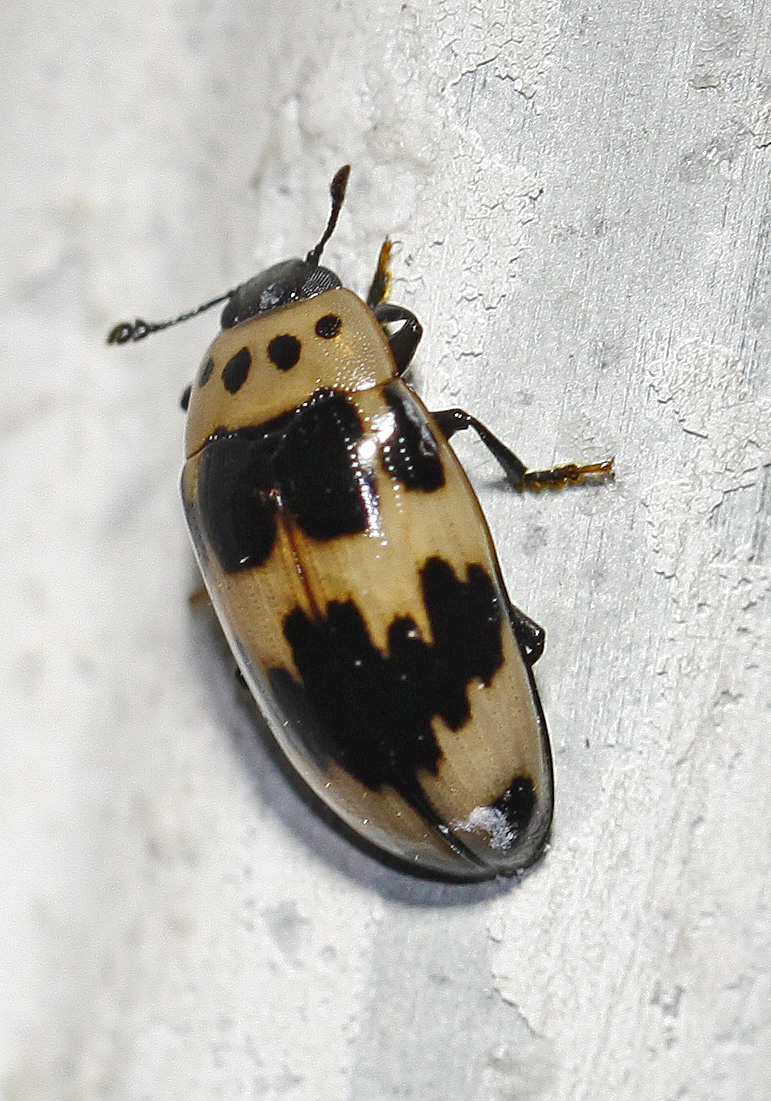
- Adult I.quadripunctatus in Woodbridge, Virginia, USA

Scientific classification
- Kingdom: Animalia
- Phylum: Arthropoda
- Clade: Pancrustacea
- Class: Insecta
- Order: Coleoptera
- Suborder: Polyphaga
- Infraorder: Cucujiformia
- Family: Erotylidae
- Subfamily: Tritominae
- Genus: Ischyrus; Lacordaire, 1842

Type species
- Erotylus quadripunctatus Olivier, 1792

Synonyms
- Micrischyrus Alvarenga, 1965

= Ischyrus =

Genus of beetles

Ischyrus is a large American genus of pleasing fungus beetles (family Erotylidae), containing more than 60 described species (though not all may be valid); in addition, a number of undescribed species are known. Almost endemic to the Neotropics, with just a few species ranging north into temperate North America, this genus is placed in subfamily Tritominae, or – in taxonomic arrangements that prefer a more comprehensive subfamily Erotylinae – in tribe Tritomini of the Erotylinae.

This genus has a convoluted nomenclatural history involving the related genera Lybas, Megischyrus and Mycotretus. Megischyrus is suspected to be a particularly close relative, but overall the monophyly of Ischyrus has not been demonstrated to satisfaction as of 2020. Some species have already been moved out of this genus to new genera like Antoinettia and Cubyrus, and it is likely that some additional species traditionally placed in Ischyrus will be moved to other genera eventually.

== Description ==
Ischyrus adults are small to mid-sized by standards of their family, 3.5–10 mm long and 2–5.5 mm wide. Their elytra have roughly parallel sides for most of their basal half; overall, the body has an elongated oval shape when seen from above, usually slightly more blunt in front, and flattened or slightly convex on top. Their carapace is covered in a somewhat indistinct microscopic reticulated relief that gives them a silky sheen, more pronounced in some species than in others; the upperside is punctuated with tiny pits.

Members of this genus have a more or less black color, usually with a various extent of pale yellowish to orange-red; typical patterns are black spots on the pronotum and black crossbands on the elytra; lengthwise stripes are less common. Some Ischyrus species are predominantly light-colored, some mostly black, but in all members of this genus the legs are brownish to black, while the outermost tip of the antennae is always black, never pale as in some relatives.

Head
The head has many loosely-strewn punctations, fairly long antennae (by Erotylidae standards), and prominent but not outsized compound eyes with large ommatidia. The ocular grooves barely reach the rear rim of the antennae bases, the epistome is thus unmargined; the "cheek" lobes below the compound eyes are small, round, and sharp-edged. The top of the head is somewhat narrowed at the rear of the compound eyes, becoming wider to the front. At least the males of some if not all species have file-like structures that, when the beetle wiggles its head, rub against the chitin and produce a squeaking sound. These do not seem to be very sophisticated compared to those of some other pleasing fungus beetles, and at least in some species of Ischyrus are short or vestigial. The clypeus has no margin along the front edge, and the mouth-cavity sides are flattened lobes.

The antennae are about half to two-thirds as long as the pronotum is wide at the base; their attachments usually do not reach to the base of the pronotum, and their segments are characteristically shaped as follows: Segment 2 is rounded and usually a bit longer than wide, while segment 3 is three times as long as wide and longer than segments 4 and 5 together. Segments 4 to 8 vary in shape among species, but are invariably longer than wide. The eighth segment is angled at the tipward end and barely wider than the seventh; the clubbed portion of the antenna tip only starts at segment 9, which is broad, wider than it is long (up to half again as wide), and has a semicircular or trapezoidal base, with rounded or straight sides. The antennal club is covered in fine hairs and a bit less than half as wide as it is long.

As for the mouthparts, the mentum has a triangular plate, usually of equal length and base-width. The galea and lacinia of the maxilla resemble those of relatives Pseudischyrus and Tritoma; those of Triplax are also similar but have two small curved teeth at the lacinia tip. The end segment of the maxillary palps forms a wide hatchet-shaped triangle or hemisphere; usually about half to two-thirds as long as it is wide, it is just half as long as it is wide in some species, but slightly longer than wide in others. Its size is relatively modest, barely larger than the end segment of the labial palps. The latter is asymmetrical, expanded medially, and about as long as it is wide (but with considerable variation between species); it is always markedly thinner than the maxillary palp end segments, in some species just one-quarter the latter's width. The tip is cut-off and carries a tiny brush.

Body and wings
The sides of the pronotum are strongly curved towards the compound eyes, with the base of the pronotum more than half again as wide as the headward edge, giving a well-rounded trapeze-shape. Behind each compound eye, there is a small bead-like margin on the pronotal edge, which is otherwise unadorned and entirely absent between the eyes and on the entire rear side. There are small punctures all over the pronotum; at each side of the pronotal base's centerline, there is a small cluster of a few larger punctures in a shallow dimple, and in the pronotum corners there are small and inconspicuous pores. The prosternum is usually pinched medially, and has a thin bead-like margin on the forward edge, which may be compressed into a pitcher-like lip or smoothly curved. At the inner edge of the coxae there are strong short straight impressed lines which barely diverge to the rear.

The mesosternum is half again as wide as it is long, and slightly wavy at the posterior margin; it has some small to mid-sized punctuations which in most species are not very distinct, however. The distance from meso- to metacoxae is about twice the distance between the mesocoxae. On the well-developed metasternum, the mesocoxal lines may be of moderate length, shortened, or missing altogether; the sternal line is medially faint. The metacoxal lines are shortened, reaching barely halfway between the rear edges of the coxae and the metasternal sides. Members of this genus have a fully functional set of two pairs of wings, with the tough elytra covering the parchment-like foldable hindwings at rest. The elytra at their widest point are wider than the prothorax where it meets the elytra, are unmargined even at the base, and have regular rows of small punctuations which extend lengthwise for almost the entire elytra. The scutellum is bluntly heart-shaped to pentagonal.

The intercoxal process of the abdomen is somewhat widened and slightly curved, and unlike in some other Erotylidae, males and females do not have conspicuously different external abdominal structures. The male genitalia have a thin hair-like flagellum, in most species without thickening or other modifications, a long internal sac with an anterior muscle attachment, and a long, strongly sclerotized and enclosed ejaculatory duct. The tegminal arms have lobes on the back; overall, the male genitalia resemble those of many Triplax and Tritoma species. Female genitalia of Ischyrus are less well studied, but in overall appearance are somewhat similar to those of Cypherotylus and Megalodacne, which among the Erotylidae are not closely related to Ischyrus however. A striking difference to those two is the large seminal receptacle of Ischyrus females, similar to that of the more closely related Aporotritoma pulchra.

Legs
The attachments of each leg pair are neither particularly close or conspicuously far away. The femora of the mid- and hindlegs are angular in cross-section, and have a conspicuous sharp-edged bead on the posterior margin. The tibiae are weakly curved and do not widen conspicuously towards the tips. The first three segments of the tarsi are increasingly widened; segment 4 is reduced, attached to the upper centerside of segment 3, and rigidly joined to segment 5.

== Ecology ==
Despite being widespread, diverse, and – at least some species – not rare, few details of these beetles' lifestyle are known. Unlike many other Erotylidae, the larvae and pupae at least of the type species I.quadripunctatus are relatively well studied. Like most pleasing fungus beetles, they are woodland animals, and are usually found in association with fungi on which adults and larvae feed. They are also encountered hiding under old tree bark, particularly in cold or wet weather or bright sunlight and heat. Some records from the southeastern US mention adults found in rotting oranges, but this does not seem to be a feeding association. Adults are attracted to lights at night, and their large-faceted eyes also suggest that Ischyrus are nocturnal animals.

Known for their multitude of contrasting patterns, at least some members of Ischyrus may be aposematic to signal a noxious or unpleasant taste: An American five-lined skink (Plestiodon fasciatus) – usually a voracious hunter of small beetles such as Ischyrus – was observed to ignore individuals of I.quadripunctatus even when the beetles came as close as to touch the predator.

== Taxonomy and nomenclature ==
The genus names Ischyrus, Lybas and Mycotretus were first published by Pierre Dejean in the second edition of his Catalogue des Coléoptères in 1836; however, he attributed these names to Louis Chevrolat instead of claiming authorship himself. Dejean's catalog was a simple list of names, with no diagostic criteria or descriptions, but as he included well-known species that hat been extensively described by previous authors in each of his genera, his genera are technically valid.

Jean Lacordaire in 1842 published a monograph on the pleasing fungus beetles. Therein, he also used the genus names Ischyrus, Lybas and Mycotretus, attributing them to Chevrolat just as Dejean did. However, Lacordaire placed Dejean's Lybas species in Mycotretus and re-established the genus Lybas for Lybas normalis, a species mentioned by preceding authors such as Dejean, but never validly described until Lacordaire's 1842 work. Meanwhile, most of Dejean's small Mycotretus species were moved into Ischyrus by Lacordaire, where they formed a second "division" (subgenus) distinct from the large tropical species which had already been placed in Ischyrus by Dejean.

In 1873, George Crotch split genus Ischyrus, elevating Lacordaire's groups to full genus status. But he retained the name Ischyrus for the second group, which had been treated as Mycotretus by Dejean. The first group, Dejean's Ischyrus, was named Megischyrus by Crotch, formally fixing its type species as the Erotylus undatus described by Guillaume-Antoine Olivier, which was also listed first in Dejean's list of Ischyrus species. For his Ischyrus, Crotch designated Olivier's Erotylus quadripunctatus as type species. As he only referred back to Lacordaire, Crotch overlooked that Dejean had included this species in Mycotretus, preventing its use as type species of Ischyrus.

Subsequent authors applied the genus names as proposed by Crotch, until Moacyr Alvarenga in 1965 revalidated Dejean's Ischyrus with E.undatus as type species, making Megischyrus a junior objective synonym and invalidating it. For the second group, containing the smaller species of Lacordaire's Ischyrus, Alvarenga established the genus Micrischyrus, with E.quadripunctatus as type species to exactly replace Crotch's Ischyrus which had become a junior homonym by the abolishment of Megischyrus, and likewise invalidated. However, almost all Erotylidae research at that time was published in English, with Japanese and German having some minor relevance due to prolific experts Michio Chûjô and Kurt Delkeskamp, whereas Alvarenga published in Brazilian Portuguese and his nomenclatural acts appeared in the then little-known zoological bulletin of the Federal University of Paraná (now Acta Biologica Paranaense). Consequently, unaware of Alvarenga's proposed solution to a problem they often were not even aware of in the first place, other erotylid researchers continued to apply Crotch's nomenclature.

To resolve this situation, Paul E. Skelley and Michael A. Goodrich in 1994 petitioned the ICZN to rule Dejean's descriptions as invalid; this would preserve the prevailing genus assignments, as the Ischyrus/Micrischyrus scheme had not been used much outside Alvarenga's own publications, and all the late-20th century landmark studies and major species catalogs used the Megischyrus/Ischyrus scheme. In 1996, the ICZN agreed to this proposal, establishing Lacordaire as the author of Ischyrus due to Crotch's revalidation of his taxon. This also permitted E.quadripunctatus to be type species of Ischyrus, courtesy of Lacordaire having moved it there.

=== Species ===
As per Crotch's understanding, this genus unites most of small species from the "second division" of Lacordaire's Ischyrus, namely the group around the type species I.quadripunctatus; hence Alvarenga's proposed name Micrischyrus (meaning "tiny Ischyrus"):

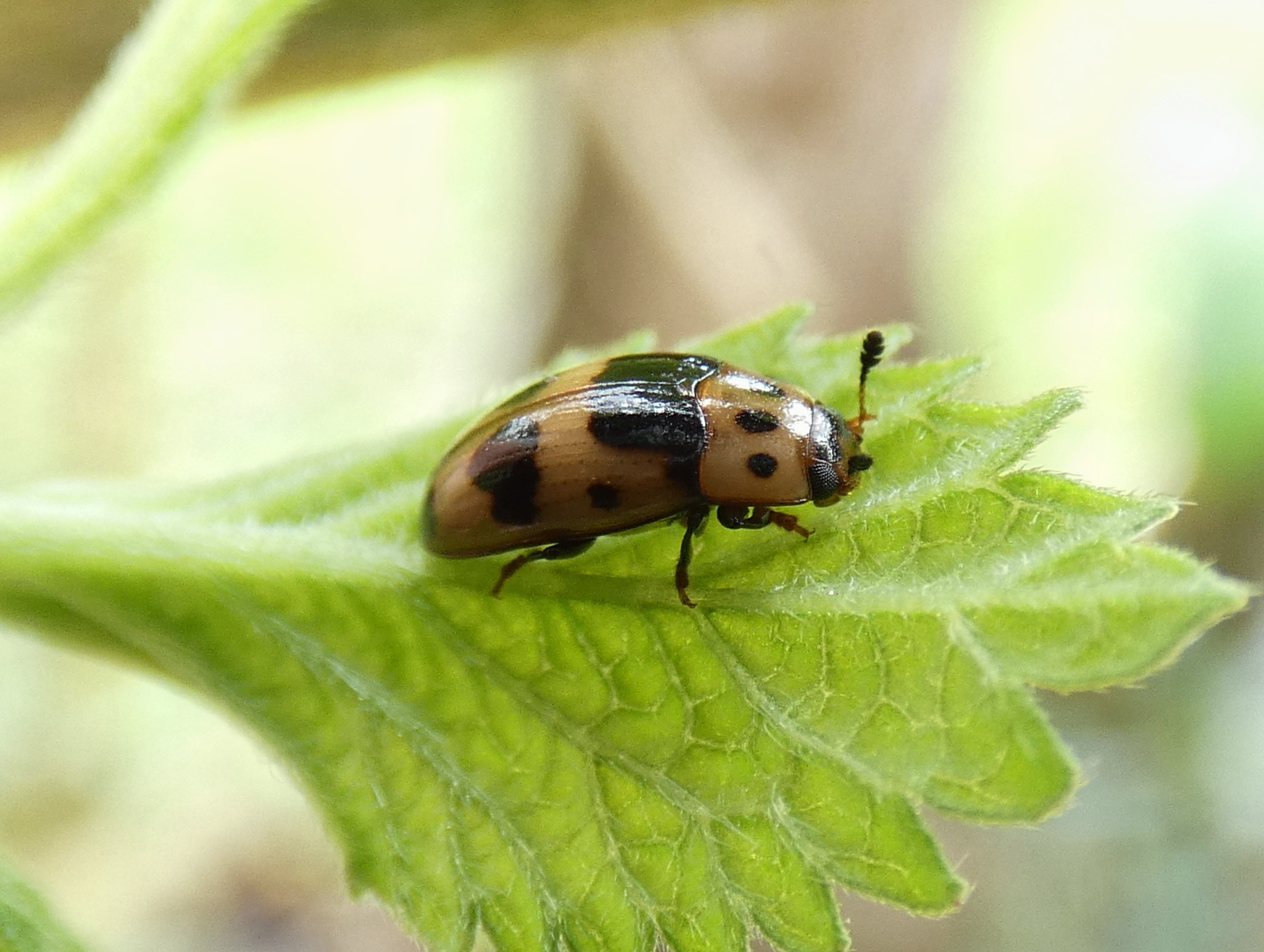
I.ichnus adult in El Valle de Antón, Panama

- Ischyrus aleator Boyle, 1954
- Ischyrus angularis Lacordaire, 1842
- Ischyrus auriculatus Lacordaire, 1842
- Ischyrus bahiae Crotch, 1876
- Ischyrus bellopictus (Kuhnt, 1910)
- Ischyrus bellus Guérin, 1949
- Ischyrus bogotae Crotch, 1876
- Ischyrus boucardi Crotch, 1876
- Ischyrus celatus
- Ischyrus chacojae Gorham, 1887
- Ischyrus circumcinctus Delkeskamp, 1957 (tentatively placed here; Megischyrus?)
- Ischyrus collatinus Crotch, 1876
- Ischyrus conductus Kuhnt, 1910
- Ischyrus consimilis Crotch, 1876
- Ischyrus cordiformis
- Ischyrus erosus
- Ischyrus decorus Guérin, 1949
- Ischyrus disconigrum Mader, 1942 (= I.disconiger)
- Ischyrus distinguendus Lacordaire, 1842
- Ischyrus dunedinensis – three-spotted pleasing fungus beetle
- Ischyrus duponti Lacordaire, 1842
- Ischyrus elegantulus Lacordaire, 1842
- Ischyrus ephippiatus Gorham, 1887
- Ischyrus episcaphulinus Gorham, 1887
- Ischyrus femoralis (Chevrolat, 1841)
- Ischyrus fraternus Lacordaire, 1842
- Ischyrus frontalis Lacordaire, 1842 (= I.agnatus)
- Ischyrus fulmineus Delkeskamp, 1957
- Ischyrus goliai
- Ischyrus grammicus Gorham, 1883
- Ischyrus gratiosus Guérin-Méneville, 1844
- Ischyrus ichnus
- Ischyrus impressopunctatus
- Ischyrus impressus
- Ischyrus incertus Lacordaire, 1842
- Ischyrus insolens Crotch, 1876
- Ischyrus interruptus (Duponchel, 1825)
- Ischyrus joplini
- Ischyrus kempferi (Alvarenga, 1977)
- Ischyrus laetus Lacordaire, 1842
- Ischyrus lineatus Kuhnt, 1910
- Ischyrus macularis Lacordaire, 1842
- Ischyrus malleus
- Ischyrus mimus Skelley, 1998
- Ischyrus monochromatus
- Ischyrus mystacis Skelley, 1998
- Ischyrus natalensis Guérin, 1956
- Ischyrus nigrolineatus Crotch, 1876
- Ischyrus nitidior Crotch, 1876
- Ischyrus nobilis Crotch, 1876
- Ischyrus palliatus Lacordaire, 1842
- Ischyrus parallelus
- Ischyrus parcarum Skelley, 1998
- Ischyrus pardalinus Guérin, 1949
- Ischyrus patruelis Lacordaire, 1842
- Ischyrus peruae Mader, 1942
- Ischyrus peruvianus Gorham, 1883
- Ischyrus pictus Gorham, 1887
- Ischyrus poseidon
- Ischyrus proximus Lacordaire, 1842
- Ischyrus putei
- Ischyrus pyropodus
- Ischyrus quadripunctatus – four-spotted fungus beetle (= I.chiasticus, I.graphicus, I.puncticollis, I.subcylindricus)
- Ischyrus quinquepunctatus Gorham, 1887
- Ischyrus rubens Gistel, 1848
- Ischyrus scriptus (Olivier, 1807) (= I.maculiventris)
- Ischyrus scutellaris Gorham, 1887
- Ischyrus septemsignatus Gorham, 1887
- Ischyrus sheppardi Crotch, 1876
- Ischyrus similior Crotch, 1876
- Ischyrus tetragrammus Kuhnt, 1910
- Ischyrus tetraspilotus Guérin-Méneville, 1844
- Ischyrus tetrasticus Gorham, 1887
- Ischyrus tripunctatus Crotch, 1873
- Ischyrus undulatus Gorham, 1887
- Ischyrus variabilis (Duponchel, 1825)
- Ischyrus velatus Lacordaire, 1842
- Ischyrus vespertilio Lacordaire, 1842
- Ischyrus vittatus Crotch, 1876

"Ischyrus" sapphirus, the only blue-colored species placed into this genus in recent times, was split off to a new monotypic genus Cubyrus in 2009. Apart from its strikingly different appearance, it is also an endemic of Cuba, while the genus Ischyrus proper has only a marginal presence in the Caribbean islands, perhaps just as accidental human introductions and with no known endemic members.

Similarly, "Ischyrus" tarsalis was described from "Haïty" and later supposedly recorded on Cuba too; it eventually turned out to be a member of the Caribbean endemic genus Notaepytus, with the Cuban records referring to the closely related Notaepytus tarsatus which was originally described in "Oocyanus" (= Epytus). The former "I." flavitarsis is also now in Notaepytus

In 2020, "Ischyrus" audbalus and "I." kovariki were moved to a new genus Antoinettia; their antenna "clubs" lack the rapidly widening base present in "true" Ischyrus, and instead – like those of Megischyrus – have a long and narrowly triangular 9th antenna segment.

It is also possible that undescribed Ischyrus species still exist. A review of the UPN collection found three apparent Ischyrus specimens from Valle del Cauca Department in western Colombia which did not seem to match the species known from the region.
