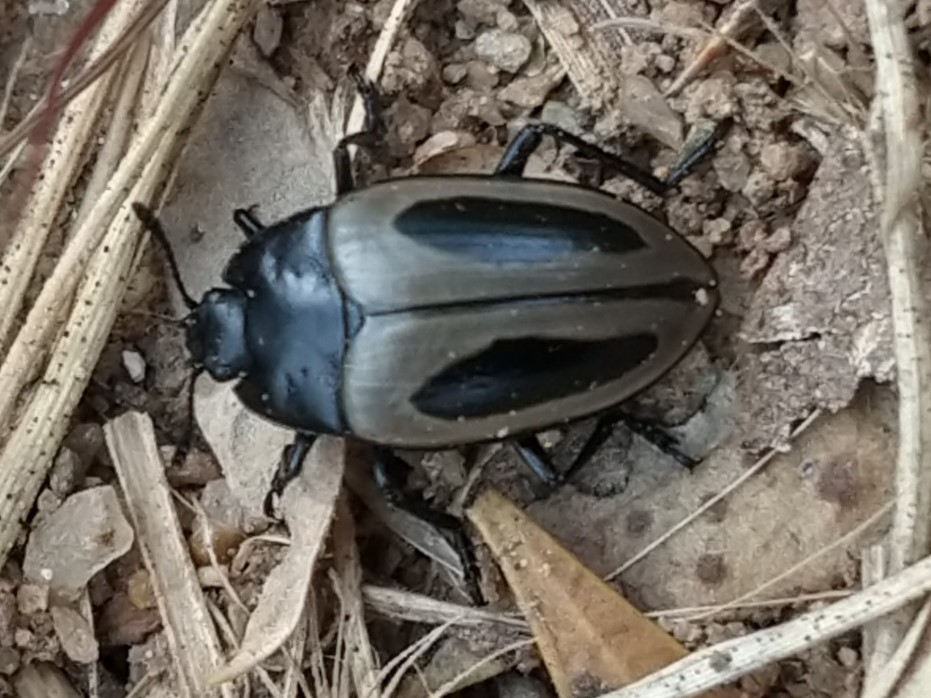
- Megischyrus zonalis in Chancaní, Pocho Department, Argentina

Scientific classification
- Kingdom: Animalia
- Phylum: Arthropoda
- Clade: Pancrustacea
- Class: Insecta
- Order: Coleoptera
- Suborder: Polyphaga
- Infraorder: Cucujiformia
- Family: Erotylidae
- Genus: Megischyrus; Crotch, 1873

Type species
- Erotylus undatus Olivier, 1792

Synonyms
- Ischyrus Chevrolat, 1837 (lapsus); Ischyrus Dejean, 1836 ("1837"; unavailable)

= Megischyrus =

Genus of beetles

Megischyrus is a sizeable Neotropical genus of pleasing fungus beetles (family Erotylidae), containing about 3 dozen described species. It is placed in subfamily Tritominae, or – in taxonomic arrangements that prefer a more comprehensive subfamily Erotylinae – in tribe Tritomini of the Erotylinae. The adults are usually oval from above, robust, with distinctly clubbed antennae, and often with boldly patterned elytra reminiscent of the carrion beetles (which are not particularly closely related).

This genus has a convoluted nomenclatural history involving the related genera Ischyrus, Lybas and Mycotretus. Its closest relative is presumed to be most or all of Ischyrus sensu lato, i.e. including such recently split genera as Antoinettia and Cubyrus.

== Description ==
Megischyrus beetles are about 12-24 mm (0.5-0.9 in) long as adults. They have a longish, moderately convex (not conspicuously humped) body, with antennae bearing a long "club" at the tip in which the segments are still distinctly visible; segment 9 of the antennae is triangular, at least as long as it is wide, with straight sides and a very narrow base. Their compound eyes have large ommatidia, the clypeus has no margin on its smooth front edge, and the mentum of the mouthparts is triangular. The end segments of the maxillary palps are wider than long, and the maxillary lacinia bear no teeth at least in some members of this genus – as is the case in other Ischyrus sensu lato. But apparently, the type species M.undatus has two small curved teeth there, as many closely related genera (such as Triplax do. The end segments of the labial palps are somewhat less enlarged than those on the maxilla, and the mouth-cavity sides are flattened lobes. The prosternum has a bead-like margin along the front, and thin lines between the coxae and the front; usually, it also has a conspicuous keel that projects towards the head. On the legs, the tibiae are narrow, with parallel sides that do not widen towards the tips, and the first three segments of the tarsi are increasingly widened.

== Taxonomy and nomenclature ==
The genus Megischyrus was established in 1873 by George Crotch. He used it for a group of pleasing fungus beetles around the large South American species described as Erotylus undatus by Guillaume-Antoine Olivier in 1972, based on a specimen received from Cayenne. These had been named genus Ischyrus by Pierre Dejean in the second edition of his Catalogue des Coléoptères in 1836 (Note: Sometimes erroneously dated to the third edition, published 1837.) and Jean Lacordaire in his 1842 pleasing fungus beetle monograph, authors referring to Louis Chevrolat as orignator of the name Ischyrus. In Dejean's list of Ischyrus species, the large South American erotylid described as Erotylus undatus by Guillaume-Antoine Olivier in 1972, based on a specimen received from Cayenne, was listed first.

Lacordaire expanded Dejean's original genus Ischyrus, also including a second "division" (subgenus) of smaller species occurring more widely across the Americas. This group, in Crotch's 1873 revision, did retain the genus name. But this was not technically valid, since the genus as delimited by Crotch – namely Crotch's proposed type species Ischyrus quadripunctatus – were placed in Mycotretus by Dejean. Subsequent authors popularized Crotch's scheme, and Megischyrus for the larger, more colorful and strictly tropical species became mainstream use among pleasing fungus beetle scholars worldwide.

In 1965, Brazilian specialist Moacyr Alvarenga tried to resolve the situation by revalidating. Dejean's Ischyrus with E.undatus as type species, making Megischyrus a junior objective synonym and invalidating it. For the second group, containing the smaller species of Lacordaire's Ischyrus, Alvarenga established the genus Micrischyrus, with E.quadripunctatus as type species to exactly replace Crotch's Ischyrus which had become a junior homonym by the abolishment of Megischyrus, and likewise invalidated. However, almost all Erotylidae research at that time was published in English, with Japanese and German having some minor relevance due to prolific experts Michio Chûjô and Kurt Delkeskamp, whereas Alvarenga published in Brazilian Portuguese and his nomenclatural acts appeared in the then little-known zoological bulletin of the Federal University of Paraná (now Acta Biologica Paranaense). Consequently, unaware of Alvarenga's proposed solution to a problem they often were not even aware of in the first place, other erotylid researchers continued to apply Crotch's nomenclature.

To resolve this situation, Paul E. Skelley and Michael A. Goodrich in 1994 petitioned the ICZN to rule Dejean's descriptions as invalid; this would preserve the prevailing genus assignments, as the Ischyrus/Micrischyrus scheme had not been used much outside Alvarenga's own publications, and all the late-20th century landmark studies and major species catalogs used the Megischyrus/Ischyrus scheme. In 1996, the ICZN agreed to this proposal, establishing Lacordaire as the author of Ischyrus due to Crotch's revalidation of his taxon, and making Crotch's establishment of Megischyrus and his use of Dejean's first-listed Ischyrus species as Megischyrus type legitimate.

=== Species ===
As per Crotch's understanding, this genus unites the large tropical species from the "first division" of Lacordaire's Ischyrus, which was the original Ischyrus genus as delimited by Dejean; hence Crotch's name Megischyrus (meaning "great Ischyrus", from Ancient Greek megas μέγας, "great"):

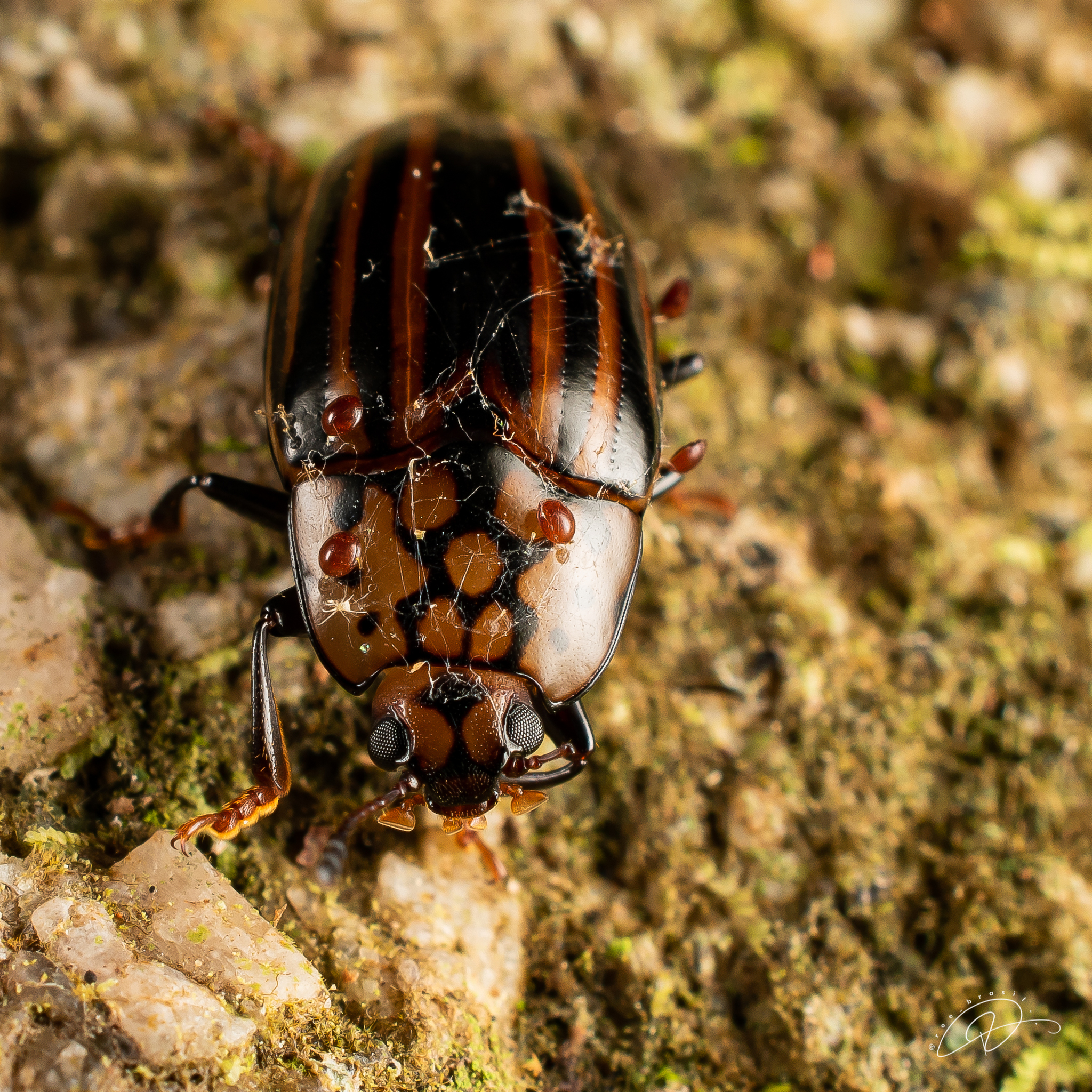
Megischyrus octostriatus attacked by little red acariform mites (probably Erythraeidae larvae), Cascatinha district, Petrópolis, Brazil

- Megischyrus angustatus (Lacordaire, 1842)
- Megischyrus bartleti Gorham, 1883
- Megischyrus bellicosus (Lacordaire, 1842)
- Megischyrus bifasciatus Guérin, 1952
- Megischyrus bogotae Crotch, 1876
- Megischyrus brasiliensis (Lacordaire, 1842)
- Megischyrus catenatus Crotch, 1876
- Megischyrus catenulatus (Lacordaire, 1842)
- Megischyrus chevrolati Crotch, 1876
- Megischyrus circumscriptus (Duponchel, 1825)
- Megischyrus columbianus (Lacordaire, 1842)
- Megischyrus connexus Crotch, 1876
- Megischyrus decempunctatus (Guérin-Méneville, 1841)
- Megischyrus discipennis (Lacordaire, 1842)
- Megischyrus elongatus Gorham, 1883
- Megischyrus guatemalae Crotch, 1876
- Megischyrus jurinei (Lacordaire, 1842)
- Megischyrus knochi (Lacordaire, 1842)
- Megischyrus laetus Schenkling, 1919
- Megischyrus lineatus (Lacordaire, 1842)
- Megischyrus mesomelas Crotch, 1876
- Megischyrus mexicanus (Lacordaire, 1842)
- Megischyrus nicaraguae Crotch, 1873
- Megischyrus octostriatus Kuhnt, 1910
- Megischyrus ohausi Mader, 1943
- Megischyrus panamanus Mader, 1942
- Megischyrus pictipennis Schenkling, 1919
- Megischyrus planior (Kirsch, 1876)
- Megischyrus sanguinolentus (Lacordaire, 1842)
- Megischyrus scaphinotus (Lacordaire, 1842)
- Megischyrus semipunctatus (Germar, 1824)
- Megischyrus semitinctus (Erichson, 1847)
- Megischyrus sicarius (Lacordaire, 1842)
- Megischyrus undatus (Olivier, 1792)
- Megischyrus zonalis (Lacordaire, 1842)

It is possible that undescribed Megischyrus species exist. A review of the UPN collection found two apparent Megischyrus specimens from Cundinamarca Department in central Colombia which did not seem to match the species known from the region.
