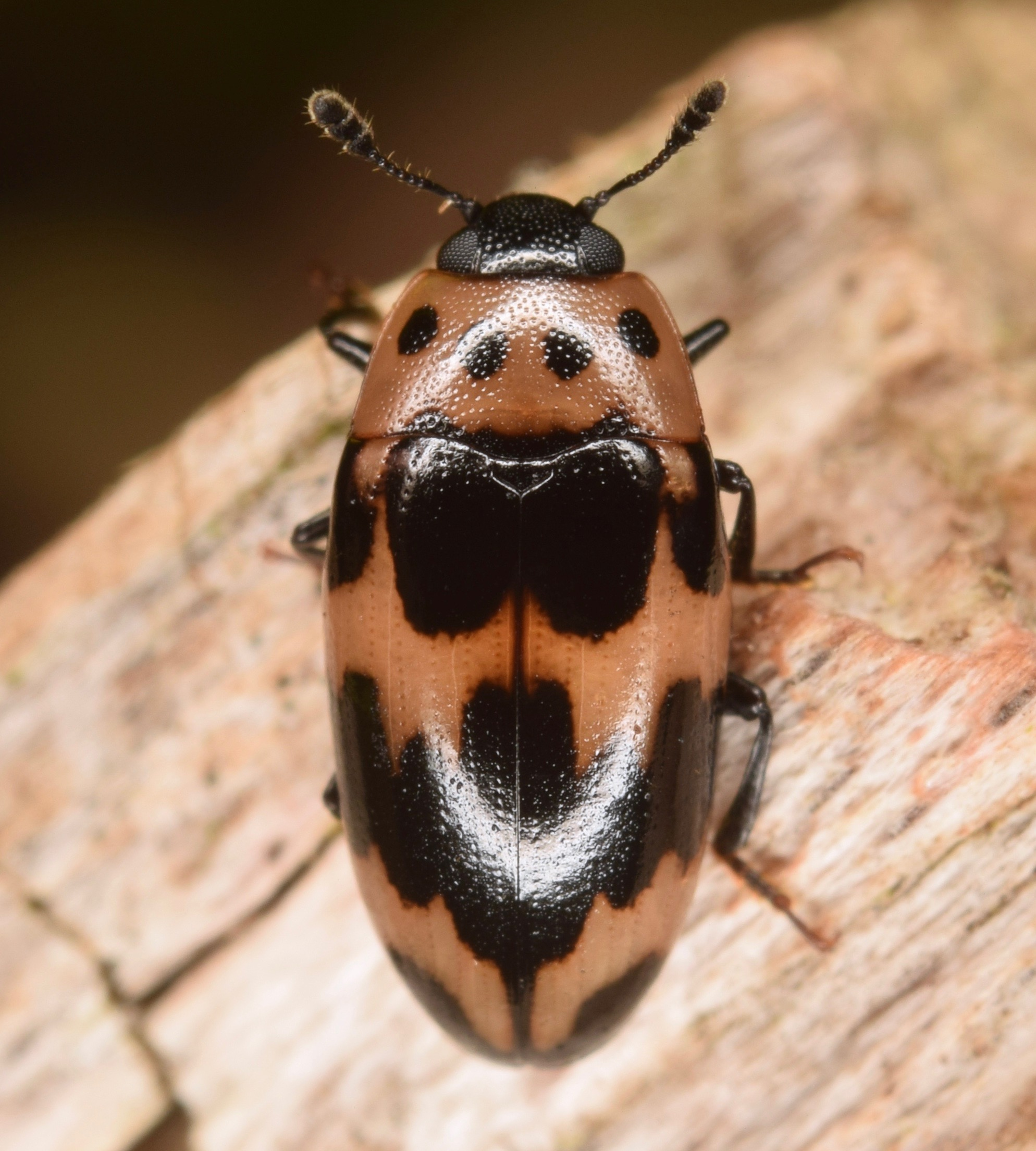
- Adult I. q. quadripunctatus in Canton, Georgia, USA

Scientific classification
- Kingdom: Animalia
- Phylum: Arthropoda
- Clade: Pancrustacea
- Class: Insecta
- Order: Coleoptera
- Suborder: Polyphaga
- Infraorder: Cucujiformia
- Family: Erotylidae
- Genus: Ischyrus
- Species: I. quadripunctatus

Binomial name
- Ischyrus quadripunctatus (Olivier, 1792)

Synonyms
- Numerous, see text

= Ischyrus quadripunctatus =

Species of beetle

Ischyrus quadripunctatus, the four-spotted pleasing fungus beetle (colloquially known in North America as four-spotted fungus beetle), is a species of pleasing fungus beetle (family Erotylidae) native to the Americas. Within its family, this beetle is placed in subfamily Tritominae, or – in taxonomic arrangements that prefer a more comprehensive subfamily Erotylinae – in tribe Tritomini of the Erotylinae.

It is found all across the American mainland from southern Canada to Paraguay and northern Argentina, as well as on a few islands – in the Caribbean there are historical records from St. Vincent and late 20th-century records from nearby St. Lucia, both in the Windward Islands.

== Description ==
=== Adult ===
Ischyrus quadripunctatus is smallish by standards of its family, i.e. a small beetle of about 0.2-0.35 in (5-9 mm) in body length and 0.08-0.15 in (2-4 mm) body width as adult. Seen from above, the body is an elongated egg-shape, barely blunter at the head than at the wingtips, widest at the well-rounded "shoulders", and with almost parallel sides. The carapace is covered in a somewhat indistinct microscopic reticulated relief that produces a dull, then silky, and finally glossy surface as it is worn down during the beetle's final stage of life.

The adults' dark-and-light color pattern is composed of patches of black and pale orange. The underside and head is all black, except for spots on each side of abdomen and prothorax, and sometimes centrally on the snout; the palps are brownish, the antennae brown with the "club" at the tip black, not pale as in some relatives. The most obvious distinguishing mark which separates I. quadripunctatus from similar species is the dark pattern on the light pronotum – four spots forming a transverse band that is a bit concave towards the head, usually unconnected from each other and the pronotal edge. A black stripe may run along the forward edge of the pronotum between the eyes, and/or at the pronotal base (where it extends across the central half or a bit wider, and may connect to the central two of the four spots). The elytra have a light-colored epipleural fold and main surface, with usually three irregular zig-zagging dark bands – through the scutellum (often broken up into a large squareish central and two smaller oval "shoulder" spots), behind half-length (almost one-fourth the elytral length except in the more extensively black center which extends as a narrow stripe all the way to the wingtip, and notched at the forward and aft margins), and at the very tip (narrow in the center, more widely extending forwards on the sides for 20-25% of the elytral length, and connected to the central band with a very narrow black stripe along the epipleura). The legs are black except for the brown tarsi, and in some populations also have light bands. The black markings, as well as the darkness of the orange color, also vary geographically, as well as between individuals.

Head
The head has long antennae (by Erotylidae standards), and prominent but not outsized compound eyes with large ommatidia; the gap between the compound eyes measures 2-2.5 times the compound eye diameter across; it is somewhat narrowed at the rear and a bit wider to the front. The punctures on top of the head are as wide as one ommatidium, and each puncture is separated by 1-3 times their diameter from the next. On the epistome, the punctures are smaller, half to three-quarters the size of those on the top of the head, and separated by the same distance or slightly less. The ocular grooves barely reach the rear rim of the antennae bases, the epistome is thus unmargined; the "cheek" lobes below the compound eyes are small, round, and sharp-edged. Males have file-like structures that, when they wiggles their head, rub against the chitin and produce a squeaking sound; however, these files are short and do not seem to be very sophisticated compared to the corresponding structure in some other pleasing fungus beetles. The clypeus has no margin along the smooth front edge, and the mouth-cavity sides are flattened lobes.

The antennae are about half to two-thirds as long as the pronotum is wide at the base; their attachments do not fully reach to the base of the pronotum, and their segments are characteristically shaped as follows: Segment 2 is rounded and usually a bit longer than wide, while segment 3 is three times as long as wide and in length almost equals the next three segments taken together. Segments 4 to 8 are longer than wide, with the eighth segment being angled at the tipward end and barely wider than the seventh; the clubbed portion of the antenna tip is covered in fine hairs and only starts at segment 9, which is a bit wider than it is long. Segments 10-11 are asymmetrical, the tenth angled at the base, the eleventh transverse; this trait distinguishes the four-spotted fungus beetle from many similar species. Altogether, the antennal club is a bit less than half as wide as it is long.

As for the mouthparts, the mentum has a broad triangular plate, notably shorter than it is wide at the base. The galea and lacinia of the maxilla resemble those of relatives Pseudischyrus and Tritoma; those of Triplax are also similar but have two small curved teeth at the lacinia tip. The end segment of the maxillary palps forms a wide asymmetric triangle, which is unusually narrow for the genus – slightly longer than it is wide. Its size is relatively modest, barely larger than the end segment of the labial palps. The latter is an asymmetric triangle, expanded medially, and slightly longer than it is wide; it is three-quarters the width of the maxillary palp end segment. The tip is cut-off and carries a tiny brush.

Thorax and wings

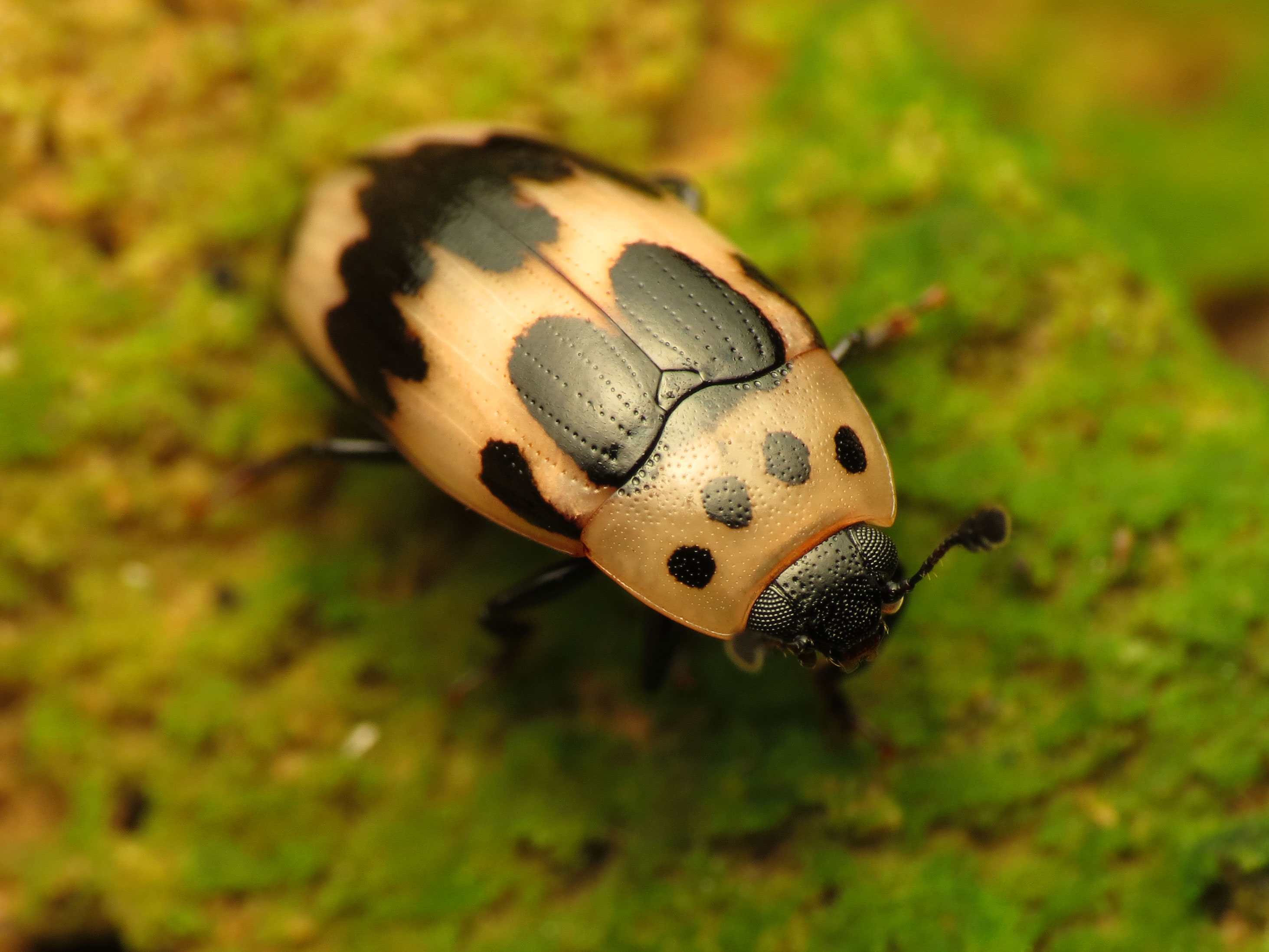
Adult I. q. quadripunctatus in Rock Creek Park, Washington DC, USA – note the namesake "four points" on the pronotum

The sides of the pronotum are smoothly curved towards the compound eyes, with the base of the pronotum more than half again as wide as the headward edge, resulting in a well-rounded trapeze-shape. Behind each compound eye, there is a small bead-like margin on the pronotal edge, which is otherwise unadorned, and entirely missing between the eyes and on the entire rear side. The pronotum is covered in punctures the same size and distance as those on top of the head, a bit more densely strewn towards the sides. At each side of the pronotal base's centerline, there is a small cluster of a few larger punctures in a shallow dimple, and in the pronotum corners there are small and insoncspicuous pores. The prosternum is twice as long as its with between the foreleg attachments, flat, with a shallowly concave base; is usually pinched and adorned with a thin bead-like margin on the forward edge, which is also strongly compressed in the center, forming a pitcher-like lip. The prosternum also has a weak lengthwise keel; strongly impressed, straight and barely diverging broken lines run rearwards from the inside of the forelegs' coxal attachment.

The mesosternum is half again as wide as it is long, slightly wavy at the posterior margin, and has a more strongly curved base with a central lobe. It has some fairly indistinct small to mid-sized punctuations, and inside of the coxal attachments run straight to slightly bent lines. The scutellum is bluntly pentagonal and half as long as it is wide. I. quadripunctatus has a fully functional set of two pairs of wings. The hardened forward ones (elytra) at their widest point are wider than the prothorax where it meets the elytra, and unmargined even at the base. They bears lines of punctures sized like those on pronotum and top of the head, which extend lengthwise for almost the entire elytra; between those punctured lines, the elytra have very fine punctures which are just one-quarter to one-fifth the diameter of the punctures forming the lines. The distance from meso- to metacoxae is almost twice the distance between the mesocoxae. The long metasternum has numerous fine punctures in the centerline, and a scarce sprinkling of larger but shallow punctures towards the sides; the coxal lines are short and reach only one-quarter to the metasternum's hindward rear angles.

Abdomen and legs

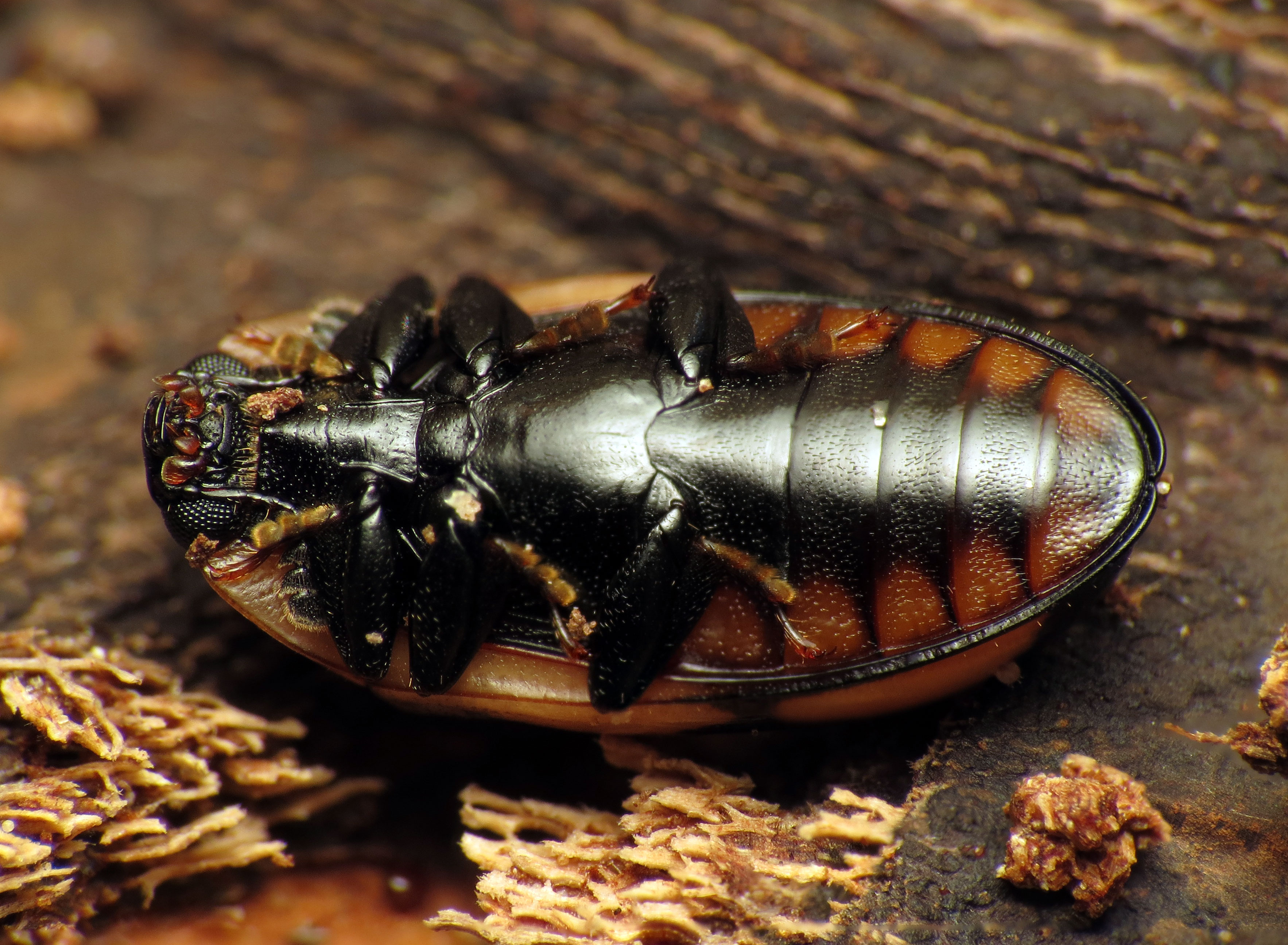
Underside of adult I. q. quadripunctatus – note orange spots along abdominal sides and black legs with brown tarsi

The abdomen has pronounced metacoxal lines which are often unbroken and in some individuals extent halfway to the rear edge. The abdominal segments are punctuated like the metasternum, with many fine punctures in the center and fewer coarser ones towards the sides. The intercoxal process of the abdomen is somewhat widened and slightly curved, and unlike in some other Erotylidae, males and females do not have conspicuously different external abdominal structures. The attachments of each leg pair are neither particularly close or conspicuously far away. The femora of the mid- and hindlegs are angular in cross-section, and have a conspicuous sharp-edged bead on the posterior margin. The tibiae are weakly curved and do not widen conspicuously towards the tips. The first three segments of the tarsi are increasingly widened; segment 4 is reduced, attached to the upper centerside of segment 3, and rigidly joined to segment 5.

The male genitalia in general layout resemble those of many species in the closely related genera Triplax and Tritoma. The median strut of the aedeagus is barely longer than the median lobe. The latter is notably curved, cut-off at the tip, and slightly constricted by a dimple just below the tip. The long internal sac protrudes anteriorly through the median hole with almost the same length as the median lobe, and has a small anterior muscle attachment – when seen from dorsally, this appears as two black dots – but no noticeable sclerotized structures. The ejaculatory duct is enclosed and strongly sclerotized, sticking tightly to the ventral wall of the internal sac; it reaches to the median hole, and in its forward half or even beyond is strongly flattened and widened horizontally. The flagellum is hair-like, long and narrow, with a flattened ribbon-like basal half, and the tegminal arms bend abruptly upwards where they emerge from the basal piece, and have lobes on the back. The female genitalia in overall appearance are somewhat similar to those of Cypherotylus and Megalodacne, which among the Erotylidae are not closely related to Ischyrus however. A striking difference to those two is the large seminal receptacle of Ischyrus females, similar to that of the more closely related Aporotritoma pulchra in having a swollen, U-shaped and much sclerotized extension. The outside of abdominal segment 9 is covered with a dense layer of tiny prickles, giving it a dark color. The genital tube has a conspicuously large extension; when everted, it stretches the 9th abdominal segment to twice the usual length or even more.

=== Larva ===
The stubby-legged sausage-shaped larva is mostly pale greyish in color. The head has dark grey patches separated by pale bands along the forehead seam and the "cheeks". The back of the first thorax segment is dark grey with a pale side arc, creating an eyespot illusion. The rest of the body has dark grey bands across the back on each segment. The back of each body segment except the last has tubercles at the sides and in the middle, which get larger and project forked spikes toward the rear; on the abdomen they are accompanied by weakly raised spiracles. The back of the 9th abdominal segment has conspicuous stubby and well-separated urogomphi.

== Distribution and ecology ==
Ischyrus quadripunctatus is widespread in the Americas, occurring from sea level to at least 5,000-6,000 ft (1,500-1,800 m) AMSL. Northwards, it ranges into Quebec, Ontario and Manitoba in Canada; it is not naturally found in the New England states. Its western limit in North America is mostly around the 100th meridian west, running south through South Dakota, Nebraska, Kansas and Oklahoma to Texas; it sparsely extends forther west through New Mexico to southeastern Arizona. There, and in Mexico, its western limit is around the 110th meridian west, and it has been recorded near Mazatlán on the Pacific Ocean coast. The southern limit is less well understood – it certainly ranges naturally through Central America all the way to Costa Rica, but in South America, records are scarce, and while the species has been found in Paraguay and nearby northern Argentina, to what extent accidental transport by humans has spread it across the hot and humid tropics, where other and better-adapted species of Ischyrus are plentiful, is not clear. A few records exist from the Caribbean (see below).

This beetle is a woodland species. As for the trees it associates with, it is rather undiscriminating; it has been found in native oak (Quercus, e.g. northern red oak Q.rubra), baldcypress (Taxodium distichum) and pine (Pinus) woods, but also on introduced orange (Citrus spp.) trees. More important to I. quadripunctatus than the species of trees are the Agaricomycetes fungi that grow on them – this beetle likes soft-fleshed polypores (shelf and crust fungi), in particular the white rot polypore Oxyporus latemarginatus (Hymenochaetales: Schizoporaceae) which commonly infests dead and dying fruit trees. Less commonly, the oak conk (Fuscoporia gilva) of the related family Hymenochaetaceae is sought by I. quadripunctatus, and the crust fungus Irpex lacteus (Polyporales: Irpicaceae) has also been named as an occasional food source. An old record of a supposed "Poria sp." as food of I. quadripunctatus cannot be reliably interpreted; this genus was once used as a "wastebasket taxon" to unite any and all crust fungi irrespective of their actual relationships. Altogether, considering that it is an important biocontrol of tree-parasitic fungi, the food spectrum of this beetle is not well known.

Adults are active whenever it is warm enough; should temperatures drop to near freezing, they will retreat to any sort of debris that will insulate them from the cold, with a preference for hiding under rough bark of dead trees such as burr oaks (Quercus macrocarpa). In Canada, they are only easily encountered in the hottest summer months, while in Nebraska, they are active from May to mid-August, and as far north as central Texas the adults can be encountered on the wing at night almost all year round; a December 7, 1911, record from "under trash" at a riverbank in Brownsville, Texas probably refers to hibernating individuals however, as does a record from "under old leaves" at Houston, Texas, on December 10, 1918; for an undated collection at Victoria, Texas, it was explicitly remarked that the beetles were "hibernating under bark". The adults and larvae feed on the fungi they inhabit, with adults usually encountered feeding in sizeable groups. The large bulging coarsely-faceted compound eyes indicate that this beetle is well-adapted to activity under low-light conditions, and they are attracted to bright and UV lights at night.

The contrasting color pattern of this species (and probably some of its relatives) may be a case of aposematism to signal a noxious or unleasant taste: An American five-lined skink (Plestiodon fasciatus) – usually a voracious hunter of small beetles such as I. quadripunctatus – was observed to ignore individuals of this species even when they came as close as to touch the predator.

== Systematics and nomenclature ==
Ischyrus quadripunctatus is the type species of genus Ischyrus; it was originally described as Erotylus quadripunctatus in Guillaume-Antoine Olivier's series Coléoptères in 1792; his specimen was collected at an unspecified location in the former Province of Georgia. The genus Ischyrus, like its relative Mycotretus, was first published by Pierre Dejean in the second edition of his Catalogue des Coléoptères in 1836; however, he attributed the name to Louis Chevrolat instead of claiming authorship himself. Dejean's catalog was a simple list of names, with no diagostic criteria or descriptions, but as he included well-known species that hat been extensively described by previous authors in each of his genera, his genera are technically valid. In 1842, Jean Lacordaire published his revision of the pleasing fungus beetles. He, too, used the genus names Ischyrus and Mycotretus, attributing them to Chevrolat just as Dejean did. However, Lacordaire moved most of Dejean's small Mycotretus species into Ischyrus, where they formed a second "division" (subgenus) distinct from the large tropical species which had already been placed in Ischyrus by Dejean.

In 1873, George Crotch split genus Ischyrus, elevating Lacordaire's groups to full genus status. But he retained the name Ischyrus for the second group, which had been treated as Mycotretus by Dejean. The first group, Dejean's Ischyrus, was named Megischyrus by Crotch, formally fixing its type species as the Erotylus undatus described by Olivier, which was also listed first in Dejean's list of Ischyrus species. For his Ischyrus, Crotch designated Olivier's Erotylus quadripunctatus as type species. As he only referred back to Lacordaire, Crotch overlooked that Dejean had included this species in Mycotretus, preventing its use as type species of Ischyrus.

Subsequent authors applied the genus names as proposed by Crotch, until Moacyr Alvarenga in 1965 revalidated Dejean's Ischyrus with E.undatus as type species, making Megischyrus a junior objective synonym and invalidating it. For the second group, containing the smaller species of Lacordaire's Ischyrus, Alvarenga established the genus Micrischyrus, with E.quadripunctatus as type species to exactly replace Crotch's Ischyrus which had become a junior homonym by the abolishment of Megischyrus, and likewise invalidated. However, almost all Erotylidae research at that time was published in English, with Japanese and German having some minor relevance due to prolific experts Michio Chûjô and Kurt Delkeskamp, whereas Alvarenga published in Brazilian Portuguese and his nomenclatural acts appeared in the then little-known zoological bulletin of the Federal University of Paraná (now Acta Biologica Paranaense). Consequently, unaware of Alvarenga's proposed solution to a problem they often were not even aware of in the first place, other erotylid researchers continued to apply Crotch's nomenclature.

To resolve this situation, Paul E. Skelley and Michael A. Goodrich in 1994 petitioned the ICZN to rule Dejean's descriptions as invalid; this would preserve the prevailing genus assignments, as the Ischyrus/Micrischyrus scheme had not been used much outside Alvarenga's own publications, and all the late-20th century landmark studies and major species catalogs used the Megischyrus/Ischyrus scheme. In 1996, the ICZN agred to this proposal, establishing Lacordaire as the author of Ischyrus due to Crotch's revalidation of his taxon. This also permitted E.quadripunctatus to be type species of Ischyrus, courtesy of Lacordaire having moved it there.

=== Synonyms ===
Throughout its convoluted taxonomical history, Ischyrus quadripunctatus has been referred to by a large number of scientific names, not all of them validly established. A few supposedly distinct species were also recognized to be simply the long-known species first described by Olivier. Such obsolete scientific names for the four-spotted fungus beetle are:

- "Engis variegata" Dejean, 1821 (nomen nudum)
- Erotylus quadripunctatus Olivier, 1792
- Ischyrus chiasticus Boyle, 1954
- Ischyrus graphicus Lacordaire, 1842
- Ischyrus puncticollis Gorham, 1887
- Ischyrus subcylindricus Lacordaire, 1842
- Micrischyrus chiasticus (Boyle, 1954)
- Micrischyrus puncticollis (Gorham, 1887)
- Micrischyrus subcylindricus (Lacordaire, 1842)
- "Mycotretus humeralis" Chevrolat in Dejean, 1836 (nomen nudum, non Germar, 1824: preoccupied)
- Mycotretus quadripunctatus (Olivier, 1792) nec Crotch, 1876
- "Mycotretus subcylindricus" Chevrolat in Dejean, 1836 (nomen nudum)
- Mycotretus variegata (Dejean, 1836)

=== Subspecies ===
Three subspecies have been proposed within Ischyrus quadripunctatus:

- Ischyrus quadripunctatus chiasticus Boyle, 1954 – described from Patagonia, Arizona, near the Mexican border; recorded mainly from canyons of the Baboquivari, Chiricahua, Huachuca, Santa Catalina and Santa Rita Mountains, as well as the Nogales region, of southern Arizona; furthermore reported from the Pacific side of northern Mexico south at least to Mazatlan, Sinaloa, but absent from Baja California.
- Ischyrus quadripunctatus graphicus Lacordaire, 1842 – Central America except for the northwest, and probably South America and Caribbean; described from an unclear locality in "Mexico", and ranging northwards into Webb, Duval, Jim Wells, and Nueces counties of Texas.
- Ischyrus quadripunctatus quadripunctatus (Olivier, 1791) – North America east of the 100th meridian west, from Manitoba to Québec in southern Canada south to Florida and central Texas, with the southern limit in the Wild Horse Desert and lower Nueces River region.

In addition, varieties were named by earlier authors; today, they would be considered color morphs of no official taxonomic standing:

- Ischyrus quadripunctatus var. A Lacordaire, 1842
- Ischyrus quadripunctatus var. alabamae Schaeffer, 1931
- Ischyrus quadripunctatus var. antedivisa Mader, 1938

Specimens collected before 1890 on Saint Vincent in the Caribbean were assigned to I. q. graphicus, which might conceivably apply to the entire Neotropical population except for those of northwestern Mexico. However, I. quadripunctatus found on Saint Lucia – the island directly north of St. Vincent – in 1987 seemed within the range of variation of the nominate subspecies. Barely more than a handful of specimens – and the only Ischyrus found in the Caribbean so far –, these Lesser Antilles records seem to suggest that the species occurs elsewhere on the Windward Islands, having expanded there from northeastern Venezuela; on the other hand, they might have been accidentally introduced to the islands in human cargo. In South America, records are also spotty, with occurrences south to Paraguay and northern Argentina, but particularly few historical reports. Another supposed Caribbean record from Cuba was in error, the individuals in question actually originating in New Orleans.

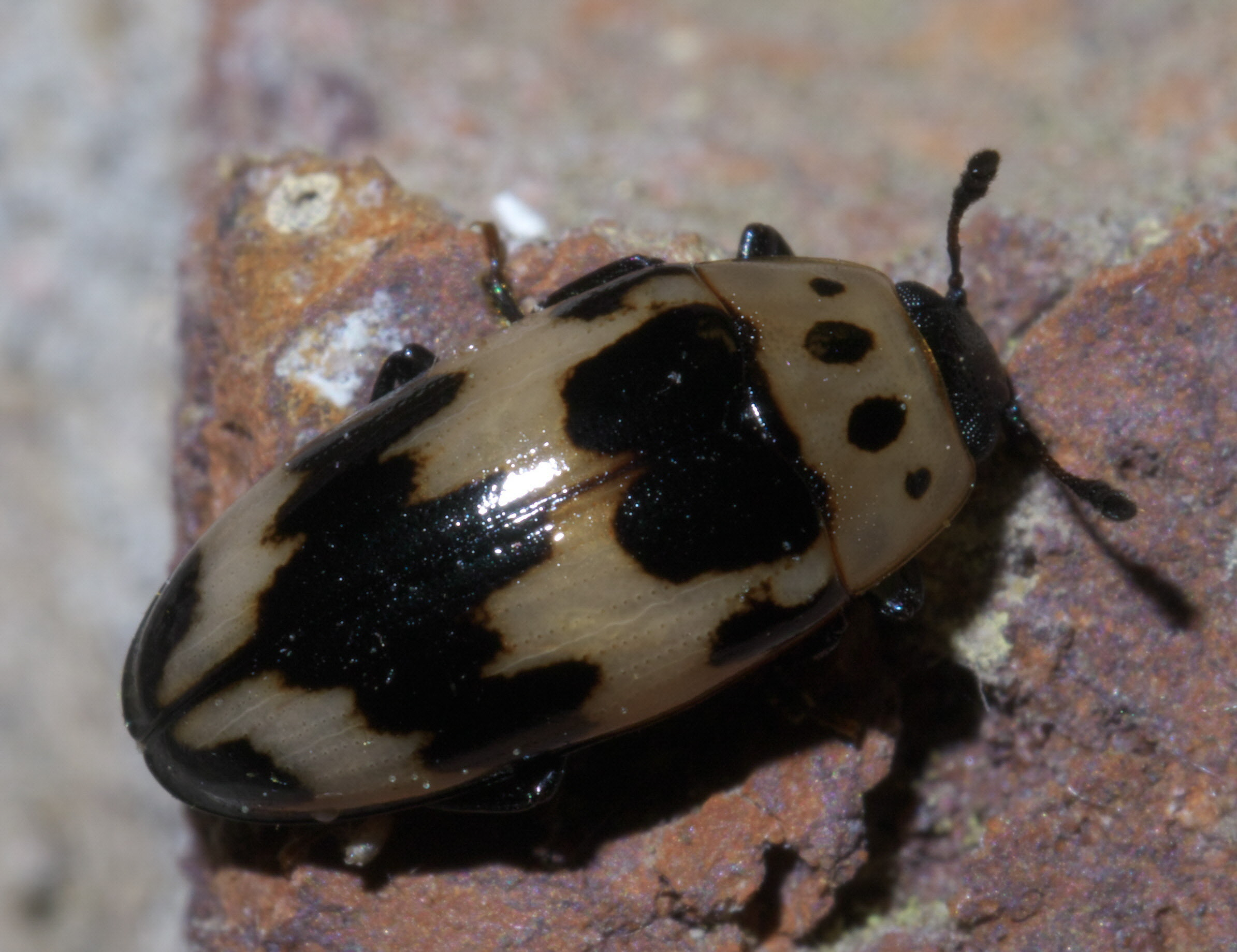
Adult I. q. quadripunctatus from the outskirts of Pryor Creek, Oklahoma, with unusually small outer spots and basal mark on pronotum

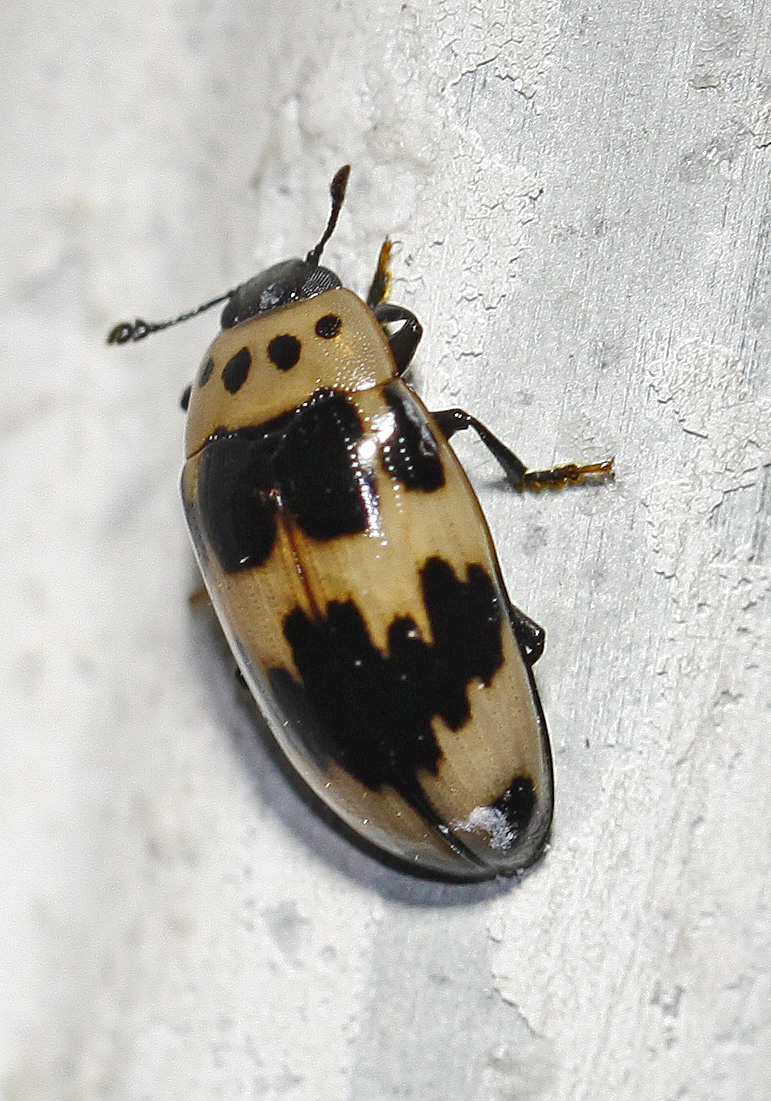
Adult I. q. quadripunctatus from the outskirts of Woodbridge, Virginia approaching the chiasticus pattern, with vivid orange color and reduced wing-base and wing-tip markings

Whether any subspecies warrant recognition at all has thus been questioned in recent times. Details in coloration – notably, the lightness of the orange color, the size and shape of the black pronotal and elytral markings, the presence or absence of orange leg bands and snout spot, and the extent of the orange marks on the abdominal sides – do vary markedly between populations. However, this variation seems to be mostly clinal, with no abrupt geographical breaks that would suggest the existence of clearly distinct subspecies.

The forms named antedivisa and alabamae differ in the extent to which the orange coloration spreads from the sides to the center of the abdomen, and in the former case also have a less-developed wing-base band which is split into three widely-separated blotches. The latter trait, however, is common in the northeast of the species' North American range; Floridan specimens, however, almost invariably have a continuous black band along the bases.

The graphicus color pattern is characterized by an orange snout spot, a reddish tip to the prosternum, and orange abdominal marks that reach far towards the center; tropical specimens have the latter two markings even more extensive, but a rather narrow central band on the elytra, and generally have two black dots in the center of the forward edge of the pronotum; they also tend to be on the small end of the species' size range and are usually darker orange. All the Windward Islands specimens have a good-sized snout spot but no leg bands, and the basal mark on the pronotum is large, three-pronged, and extends to the two central spots.

The chiasticus color pattern resembles graphicus in having an orange snout spot and two black dots in the center of the pronotum's forward edge; these are connected by a thin black band in chiasticus, but not always so in graphicus. The central wing-band is more extensive, less notched, and its central extension to the wingtip is quite wide. The wingtip band consists of two wide blotches on the elytral sides, connected to the central band by a very narrow black elytral fringe. Most strikingly, the black pattern at the elytral base is entirely broken up into two comma-shaped side spots, and a central spot which is indented at the rear and the sides, resulting in a fat "X" shape that appears as if bordered by single quotation marks: ' X ' – hence the subspecies' name. In addition, the sternites are extensively reddish on the sides on the abdomen as well as on the thorax, and the red color may even go all the way to the centerline. Also, they tend to be on the large end of the species' size range, but even so they overlap in size with all but the smallest chiasticus.
