= It's Time (Australian campaign) =

Australian political campaign

- Campaign: 1972 Australian federal election
- Candidate: Gough Whitlam
- Affiliation: Australian Labor Party
- Status: Successful (Elected)
- Headquarters: Canberra (National Secretariat) / Blacktown (Official Launch)
- Key people: Mick Young (Campaign Director); Graham Freudenberg (Speechwriter); Paul Jones (Creative Director)
- Slogan: "It's Time"
- Chant: "It's Time! It's Time!"

Campaign poster

It's Time was a political campaign run by the Australian Labor Party (ALP) under Gough Whitlam during the 1972 federal election in Australia. Campaigning on the perceived need for change after 23 years of conservative (Liberal-Country Party coalition) government, Labor put forward a raft of major policy proposals, accompanied by a television advertising campaign of prominent celebrities singing a jingle entitled It's Time. It was ultimately successful, as Labor picked up eight seats and won a majority. This was the first time Labor had been in government since it lost the 1949 federal election to the Liberal Party.

== Origins ==
In the 1969 federal election, the endorsed ALP candidate for the blue-ribbon Liberal seat of Ryan, John Conn, then a lecturer at the University of Queensland, had employed a highly successful door-to-door campaign. For this, he had devised a pamphlet headed: 'It's Time for a Change' followed by a dot-point list of reasons, including education, the war in Vietnam, urban renewal, etc. He managed a swing of 10.5 per cent, by far the biggest in Queensland, forcing the incumbent, Nigel Drury, to DLP preferences for the first time. Soon afterwards, at a post-election occasion in Brisbane, John Conn was approached and congratulated by Gough Whitlam and Mick Young together. They enquired about the likely reasons for the successful local campaign. Conn gave each of them a copy of his pamphlet. Young asked if Labor could expect to see a similar effort in 1972. He was told yes but that a shorter, snappier version, 'It's time ...', might be more effective for the next campaign. The originator of the idea heard no more about it until the revamped slogan re-emerged in 1972. John Conn ran again for Ryan in 1972, gaining a further swing but not quite enough to win.

== Campaign ==
The slogan "It's Time", around which the three-stage campaign was built, was conceived by Paul Jones, at the time creative director at Sydney advertising agency Hansen-Rubensohn–McCann-Erickson which was handling the ALP's advertising account. The goal of the campaign's first stage was to popularise the phrase while the television commercial was the core element of the second stage. Conceived by Jones, copywriter Ade Casey (then known as Adrienne Dames) and art director Rob Dames, it was directed by Ric Kabriel and produced through Fontana Films, Sydney. The song was written by Jones and advertising jingle writer Mike Shirley, it was arranged as well as produced by Pat Aulton. Lead singer Alison McCallum laid down the foundation track at ATA Studios, Sydney. The chorus comprising a "Who's Who" of Australian entertainment and sport personalities, including Tony Barber, Barry Crocker, Lynette Curran, Chuck Faulkner, Jimmy Hannan, Brian Henderson, Col Joye, Graham Kennedy, Dawn Lake, Bobby Limb, Little Pattie, Bert Newton, Terry Norris, Hazel Phillips, Judy Stone, Maggie Tabberer, Jack Thompson, Jacki Weaver, Kevin Sanders, Ade and Rob Dames, among others, was recorded one day in early spring at either the Hordern Pavilion or Supreme Sound in Sydney's Paddington with Joye conducting. The TV spot mainly shows McCallum and the other singers performing the song, intercut are pictures from Whitlam's private photo collection. As well as reaching its target demographic—loosely speaking, women and young people—, "the ad reached a far wider and probably quite unexpected segment of the electorate."

=== Launch ===
The It's Time campaign was first launched in Blacktown, Sydney in 1972. According to Whitlam himself, Blacktown was chosen because it "represented – symbolised even – the new outer suburbs of Sydney, Melbourne and Brisbane where we were building a new constituency. It typified all the urban policy failures of the time, through lack of planning and misallocation of resources at both Federal and State government level."

The speech that Whitlam delivered to the audience in the Blacktown Civic Centre was written for the Labor Party by Graham Freudenberg, the advisor and speech writer to several successive Labor governments.

=== Themes and policies ===
The campaign concentrated heavily on the mistakes made by the prime minister of the day, William McMahon, with a special focus given to the areas of the national economy, health care, city planning and the Vietnam War, as well as Whitlam's ideas for governmental reform.

==== Economic policy ====
Whitlam put forward an economic plan as part of his It's Time speech that advocated strong, productive relationships between the public, industry and employees. He contended that only if strong economic growth was maintained, would policies in other areas be feasible. A restoration of genuine full employment along with a projected 6-7% growth of industry were predicted. He argued that his government need not increase taxation to achieve its goals.

==== Health care reforms ====
The Labor party planned to introduce a universal health insurance scheme, to which contributions would be made according to income, thus turning the old system on its head.

Whitlam declared that the Labor party would set up an Australian Hospitals Commission to promote the modernisation and regionalisation of hospitals. Hospital services would not be the only thing the commission would be interested in. Its concern and financial backing would also go toward the creation of community-based health services and the funding of health promotion initiatives. Labor promoted funding for community health centers and public nursing homes.

==== City planning ====
Labor under Whitlam proposed co-operation with the States, local government and semi-government authorities in a major effort to reduce land and housing costs, and to suppress rises in rates and local government charges. To this end they advocated the establishment of a new Ministry of Urban Affairs to analyse, research and co-ordinate plans for each city and region and to advise the federal government on grants for urban purposes.

Whitlam claimed that the average cost of housing could be reduced by up to 20% by merely standardizing the reticulation and building and lending authority regulations. He also sought to lower interest payments by making them tax deductible. Labor committed itself to reducing the waiting time for a commission home to under twelve months.

==== Vietnam War ====
Whitlam promised an end to Australian involvement in the war in Vietnam and an end to conscription into the Australian armed forces. He underscored the relevance of treaties such as ANZUS to the defence of Australia, but also noted that beginning serious relations with China was in the country's best interest.

It was also announced that all of those previously imprisoned under the National Service Act 1964 would be released.

==== Social justice ====
Whitlam asserted that education was to be the fastest-growing public sector in Australia, should Labor gain power. In furtherance of this goal, he proposed the establishment of an Australian Schools Commission to examine and determine the needs of students in Government and non-government primary, secondary and technical schools. He promised to increase funding to schools, and to allocate it based on need, accusing his predecessor of having neglected some schools in favour of more prestigious ones. Whitlam announced that pre-school education would be paid for by the state, and that child care would be heavily subsidised under a Labor government. He also said that university fees would be abolished from 1974. The ALP saw a weakness in Australian social welfare in that it relied almost wholly on the provision of cash benefits. Whitlam said he would establish an Australian Assistance Plan with the emphasis on providing social workers to provide advice, counselling and above all the sheer human contact that the under-privileged in the community needed. He also sought to unify the different social justice systems that were in place at that time. Under Labor, the pension rate would be raised to 25% of the average Australian male's earnings.

== Political climate ==
=== Leadership ===
By 1972 Australia had been governed by the Liberal-Country coalition for 23 years. However, the Coalition had barely avoided defeat when it suffered an 18-seat swing in the 1969 federal election—one of the largest swings against a government that still managed to keep power. Labor won a majority of the two-party vote but did not win sufficient seats to form government.

After the election, Liberal Prime Minister John Gorton was unable to get the better of Whitlam. Over the next two years, the Coalition fell further behind Labor in the polls, and Gorton resigned in 1971 after a tied vote of no confidence in the Liberal caucus. However, his successor, William McMahon, was indecisive, and failed to deliver on many of the Coalition's campaign promises. McMahon was also unable to get the better of Whitlam; his skills as an orator were no match for Whitlam's abilities. One of his own most cited quotes pointed out his indecisive nature.

=== Foreign relations ===
The Coalition had focused heavily on relations with the United States since World War II to bring Australia under their defence umbrella. Under the auspices of ANZUS, Australia had sent over fifty thousand troops to Vietnam in support of the South Vietnamese forces.

Apartheid in South Africa was becoming a huge source of controversy, and there was wide public support in Australia to increase sanctions against the white government there, particularly with respect to their sports teams.

=== Economy ===
Unemployment was 2.5% and inflation was sitting on 6.1%. The Australian Dollar bought 1.93 US Dollars, 362 Yen or 1.97 Pounds Sterling. A general downturn in the western economies of the world, and the rising price of oil were contributing to a poor financial situation for Australia.

== Success ==
Labor received 49.7 per cent of the primary vote, leaving the Liberal-Country Party coalition with just 41.4 per cent. Labor, with 67 of 125 seats in the House of Representatives, now controlled Australia's lower house of Parliament by a margin of nine seats. The overall swing to Labor on 2 December was 2.5 per cent. Labor lost four seats while gaining twelve.

The 1972 election was the first ALP victory since 1946. Its success is usually attributed to both the It's Time campaign, and Whitlam's skills as an orator, though Graham Freudenberg had a major influence on many speeches given by members of the ALP during the It's Time campaign. The campaign helped the ALP to establish new voter constituencies, particularly in outer lying areas of Australia's major population centres, who until then were to a large extent marginalised by the major parties.

On his first day in office as Prime Minister of Australia, Whitlam declared an end to conscription and began arranging for those imprisoned for avoiding the draft to be released and compensated. During the next few weeks he implemented a range of new measures including the establishment of an Australian honours system and the banning of racially selected sporting teams, a move intended to impede the South African Apartheid policy. East Germany and the People's Republic of China were also recognised for the first time by an Australian government.

== Legacy ==
The words It's Time have become an important contribution to the lexicon of Labor's constituency since their first use in Blacktown in 1972. An updated version of the It's Time song was used in advertisements for the 'Yes' vote in the republic referendum in 1999, which ended with Whitlam saying: "Yes. It's time." In 2000, after another period of Liberal dominance, the phrase had an unsuccessful short-lived recurrence, with Whitlam speaking on behalf of the Leader of the Labor Party, Kim Beazley. Labor's 2015 Marriage Equality initiative used the phrase "It's Time. Marriage Equality".

The Anti Poverty Network of South Australia in 2018 with the Choir of Hard Knocks of Port Adelaide recorded a revised version of the It's Time song, it included lyrics such as:

"It’s time for changing, not deck-chair rearranging." "Time for poor folk, not rich folk." "It’s time for us folk, yes it’s time." and "It’s time for Newstart, to give a real start, One hundred more a week start, yes it’s time."

The song was used by the Anti-Poverty Network SA to campaign for the Australian Labor Party to commit if it wins government to raise Newstart, the Australian Government's Welfare and Social Safety Net for those who are unemployed.
