= Chiasm =

Chiasm may refer to:

- Chiasm (musical project), an electronic music project by Emileigh Rohn
- Chiasm (anatomy), an X-shaped structure produced by the crossing over of the fibers, with the prefix chiasm- means cross examples include:
  - A nerval chiasm, where either two nerves cross in the body midline (e.g. Optic chiasma)
  - A crossing of fibres inside a nerve reversing their mapping
  - A tendinous chiasm, the spot where two tendons cross. The tendon of the flexor digitorum longus muscle forms two: the crural chiasm (with the tendon of the tibialis posterior muscle) and the plantar chiasm (with the tendon of the flexor hallucis longus muscle).
- Chiasma (genetics), the point where two chromatids are intertwined (interwoven) in a cell
- An example of chiasmus

== See also ==
- Chiasmetes, a genus of beetles
- Chiasmus, the figure of speech in which two or more clauses are related to each other through a reversal of structures in order to make a larger point; that is, the clauses display inverted parallelism
- Chiasmus (cipher), a German government block cipher
- Chiastic structure, a literary device for chiasmus applied to narrative motifs, turns of phrase, or whole passages
