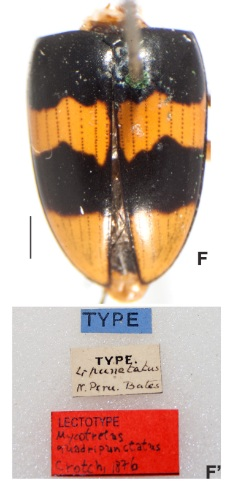

Scientific classification
- Kingdom: Animalia
- Phylum: Arthropoda
- Clade: Pancrustacea
- Class: Insecta
- Order: Coleoptera
- Suborder: Polyphaga
- Infraorder: Cucujiformia
- Family: Erotylidae
- Genus: Mycotretus
- Species: M. quadripunctatus

Binomial name
- Mycotretus quadripunctatus Crotch, 1876

= Mycotretus quadripunctatus =

Species of beetle

"Mycotretus quadripunctatus" was also erroneously applied by Dejean in 1836 to the related beetle species Ischyrus quadripunctatus.

Mycotretus quadripunctatus is a species of beetle of the Erotylidae family. This species is found in Colombia, Ecuador and Peru.
