= Mycotretus humeralis =

Scientific classification
- Kingdom: Animalia
- Phylum: Arthropoda
- Clade: Pancrustacea
- Class: Insecta
- Order: Coleoptera
- Suborder: Polyphaga
- Infraorder: Cucujiformia
- Family: Erotylidae
- Genus: Mycotretus
- Species: M. humeralis

Binomial name
- Mycotretus humeralis (Germar, 1824)

Synonyms
- Erotylus humeralis Germar, 1824

Species of beetle

"Mycotretus humeralis" was also erroneously applied Chevrolat in Dejean (1836) to the related beetle species Ischyrus quadripunctatus.

Mycotretus humeralis is a species of beetle of the Erotylidae family. This species is found in Brazil.
