= Graham Freudenberg =

Australian speechwriter (1934–2019)

Graham Freudenberg AM
- Born: 12 May 1934; Brisbane, Queensland, Australia
- Died: 26 July 2019 (aged 85); Bribie Island, Queensland, Australia
- Occupations: Journalist, author and speechwriter
- Years active: 1952–2010
- Known for: Speechwriter to a number of leaders of the Australian Labor Party,
- Notable work: "It's Time" speech for Gough Whitlam

Norman Graham Freudenberg AM (/ˈfruːdənbɜːrɡ/; 12 May 1934 – 26 July 2019) was an Australian journalist, author and political advisor and speechwriter who worked with the Australian Labor Party for over forty years, beginning when he was appointed Arthur Calwell's press secretary in June 1961.

== Early life ==
Freudenberg was born in Brisbane, Queensland. He was of Jewish origin. His father was a soldier who fought at Gallipoli and, named his son after a former colonial governor of Queensland, Field Marshall Sir Henry Norman. Freudenberg was educated at the Church of England Grammar School in Brisbane. He then studied journalism in Melbourne and worked for some years with the Melbourne Sun.

He wrote the documentary This Is Television (1960).

== Career ==
Freudenberg wrote over a thousand speeches for several leaders of the Australian Labor Party at both the federal and state level, representing New South Wales.

Senior Labor Party leaders for whom he prepared speeches included Arthur Calwell, Gough Whitlam, Neville Wran, Bob Hawke, Barrie Unsworth, Bob Carr and Simon Crean. He was "centrally involved" in policy speeches for fourteen federal elections and nine New South Wales State Elections. Freudenberg was principal speechwriter for the leading campaign "It's Time" speech that Labor leader Gough Whitlam presented at the launch of the Labor campaign for the 1972 Australian federal election.

== Honours ==
In 1990 he was appointed a Member of the Order of Australia (AM) in recognition of "services to journalism, to parliament, and to politics".

From 1995 to 1998 he served on the council of the National Library of Australia.

In June 2005, Freudenberg was inducted as a lifetime member of the Australian Labor Party (New South Wales Branch).

He won the 2009 Walkley Book Award for Churchill and Australia.

== Death ==
He lived in retirement on Bribie Island, Queensland. Freudenberg died on 26 July 2019, aged 85, after a long illness.

== Books by Freudenberg ==
- A Certain Grandeur – Gough Whitlam in Politics (1977)
- Cause for Power – the Centenary History of the NSW Labor Party (1991) ISBN 0-949138-60-6
- A Figure of Speech (2005) ISBN 1-74031-105-1 (autobiography)
- Churchill and Australia (2008) ISBN 978-1-4050-3870-6
