= Reticular (disambiguation) =

Reticular describes a set of connective tissue, fibers, etc., in network form such as with cross-link bonds.

Reticular may also refer to:

- Reticular formation, a region in the brainstem that is involved in multiple tasks
  - Reticular activating system, a set of connected nuclei in the brains of vertebrates
- Reticular cell, a type of fibroblast that produces reticular fibers
- Reticular connective tissue, a type of connective tissue that has a network of reticular fibers
  - Reticular fiber, a type of fiber in connective tissue that is composed of type III collagen
- Reticular dermis, the lower layer of the dermis composed of dense irregular connective tissue
- Reticular dysgenesis, a rare genetic disorder of the bone marrow
- Reticular erythematous mucinosis, a skin condition that tends to affect women in the third and fourth decades of life
- Reticular layer, a layer in the adrenal cortex that produces androgens
- Reticular pigmented anomaly of the flexures, a fibrous anomaly of the flexures or bending parts of the axillae, neck and inframammary/sternal areas

== See also ==
- Reticulation (disambiguation)
- Reticulum (disambiguation)
