= Reticulum (disambiguation) =

Reticulum is a star constellation

Reticulum may also refer to:

- Endoplasmic reticulum, an organelle of eukaryotes
- Anastomotic reticulum, a type of complex computer network
- Reticulum (anatomy), part of a ruminant's stomach
- Reticulum II, a dwarf galaxy

== See also ==
- Reticular (disambiguation)
- Reticulate venation
- Reticuloendothelial system
