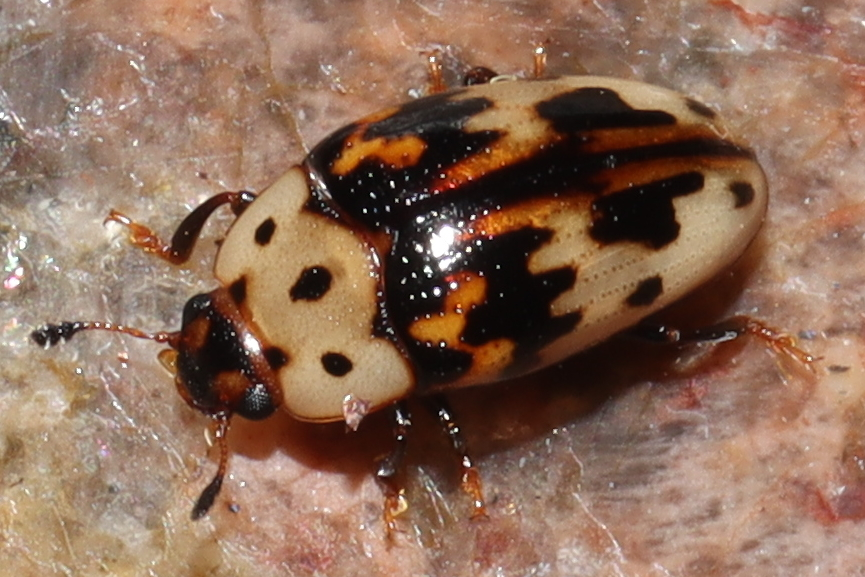
- The adult from Araçariguama mentioned below

Scientific classification
- Kingdom: Animalia
- Phylum: Arthropoda
- Clade: Pancrustacea
- Class: Insecta
- Order: Coleoptera
- Suborder: Polyphaga
- Infraorder: Cucujiformia
- Family: Erotylidae
- Genus: Ischyrus
- Species: I. impressopunctatus

Binomial name
- Ischyrus impressopunctatus Crotch, 1876

Synonyms
- Ischyrus impresso-punctatus (lapsus)

= Ischyrus impressopunctatus =

Species of beetle

Ischyrus impressopunctatus is a species of pleasing fungus beetle (family Erotylidae) endemic to Brazil. Within its family, this beetle is placed in subfamily Tritominae, or – in taxonomic arrangements that prefer a more comprehensive subfamily Erotylinae – in tribe Tritomini of the Erotylinae.

== Description ==
Its original description is in Latin. According to this, I.impressopunctatus adults have an elongated oval shape and their carapace is densely covered with small punctuations. On the elytra, larger punctuations are arranged as lengthwise stripes, with a random pattern of smaller punctuations. While Crotch does not explain his scientific name, his description emphasizes how the carapace surface is covered in impressed punctuations and adds a note in English on how the combination of this conspicuous punctuation and three black dots on the pronotum is distinctive.

As regards coloration, the head of this beetle is black; the pronotum is yellowish with a black pattern of dots in an almost crosswise line, two small triangular marks at the fore-edge which point towards the spaces between the dots, and two more widely separated marks at the rear edge near the outer dots. The elytra are reddish- to yellowish-orange, with a black centerline when they are folded. Along the wing base, there is a very jagged black crosswise band containing an orange double-spot on each side. The black crosswise band between the mid-wing and the wingtip, often found in Ischyrus species, is reduced to a large central spot and on each side a smaller dot in I.impressopunctatus. Even closer to the wingtip, each elytron has another small round black dot. The underside is blackish-red, with the prothorax colored a brighter red. The length of the type specimen was given as 2.75 "lines" (1/12 of an inch), i.e. 5.83 mm.

Head
The head has many loosely-strewn punctations, long antennae (by Erotylidae standards), and prominent but not outsized compound eyes with large ommatidia. The ocular grooves barely reach the rear rim of the antennae bases, the epistome is thus unmargined; the "cheek" lobes below the compound eyes are small, round, and sharp-edged. The top of the head is somewhat narrowed at the rear of the compound eyes, becoming wider to the front. At least the males have file-like structures that, when the beetle wiggles its head, rub against the chitin and produce a squeaking sound. These do not seem to be very sophisticated compared to those of some other pleasing fungus beetles. The clypeus has no margin along the smooth front edge, and the mouth-cavity sides are flattened lobes.

The antennae are more than half as long as the pronotum is wide at the base, and their segments are characteristically shaped as follows: Segment 2 is rounded and slightly elongated, while segment 3 is three times as long as wide and longer than segments 4 and 5 together. Segments 4 to 8 are longer than wide, with the eighth segment angled at the tipward end and barely wider than the seventh; the "clubbed" portion of the antenna tip only starts at segment 9, which is wider than it is long. The antennal club is covered in fine hairs and a bit less than half as wide as it is long.

As for the mouthparts, the mentum has a fairly narrow triangular plate. The galea and lacinia of the maxilla resemble those of relatives Pseudischyrus and Tritoma; those of Triplax are also similar but have two small curved teeth at the lacinia tip. The end segment of the maxillary palps has a wide hatchet-shape; its size is relatively modest, barely larger than the end segment of the labial palps. The latter is asymmetrical, expanded medially, and markedly thinner than the maxillary palp end segments. The tip is cut-off and carries a tiny brush.

Body and wings
The sides of the pronotum are strongly curved towards the compound eyes, with the base of the pronotum more than half again as wide as the headward edge, giving a well-rounded trapeze-shape. Behind each compound eye, there is a small bead-like margin on the pronotal edge, which is otherwise unadorned and entirely absent between the eyes and on the entire rear side. There are small punctures all over the pronotum; at each side of the pronotal base's centerline, there is a small cluster of a few larger punctures in a shallow dimple, and in the pronotum corners there are small and inconspicuous pores. The prosternum has a thin bead-like margin on the forward edge. At the inner edge of the coxae there are strong short straight impressed lines which barely diverge to the rear.

The mesosternum is half again as wide as it is long, and slightly wavy at the posterior margin; it has some smallish punctuations. The distance from meso- to metacoxae is about twice the distance between the mesocoxae. On the well-developed metasternum, the sternal line is medially faint. The metacoxal lines are shortened, reaching barely halfway between the rear edges of the coxae and the metasternal sides. This species has a fully functional set of two pairs of wings, with the tough elytra covering the parchment-like foldable hindwings at rest. The elytra at their widest point are wider than the prothorax where it meets the elytra, are unmargined even at the base, and have regular rows of small punctuations which extend lengthwise for almost the entire elytra. The scutellum is bluntly angular.

The intercoxal process of the abdomen is somewhat widened and slightly curved, and unlike in some other Erotylidae, males and females do not have conspicuously different external abdominal structures. The male genitalia of Ischyrus have a thin hair-like flagellum, a long internal sac with an anterior muscle attachment, and a long, strongly sclerotized and enclosed ejaculatory duct. The tegminal arms have lobes on the back; overall, the male genitalia resemble those of many Triplax and Tritoma species. Female genitalia of Ischyrus are less well studied, but in overall appearance are somewhat similar to those of Cypherotylus and Megalodacne, which among the Erotylidae are not closely related to Ischyrus however. A striking difference to those two is the large seminal receptacle of Ischyrus females, similar to that of the more closely related Aporotritoma pulchra.

Legs
The attachments of each leg pair are neither particularly close or conspicuously far away. The femora of the mid- and hindlegs are angular in cross-section, and have a conspicuous sharp-edged bead on the posterior margin. The tibiae are weakly curved and do not widen conspicuously towards the tips. The first three segments of the tarsi are increasingly widened; segment 4 is reduced, attached to the upper centerside of segment 3, and rigidly joined to segment 5.

== Distribution ==
The type specimen is in the MCZC collection; its type locality is simply given as "Brazil". Records have been from the south and southeast of that country, e.g. a beetle matching the original description was identified in Araçariguama, São Paulo State in 2022.
