= Suction trap =

Machine that uses air to gather e.g. liquid or mucus

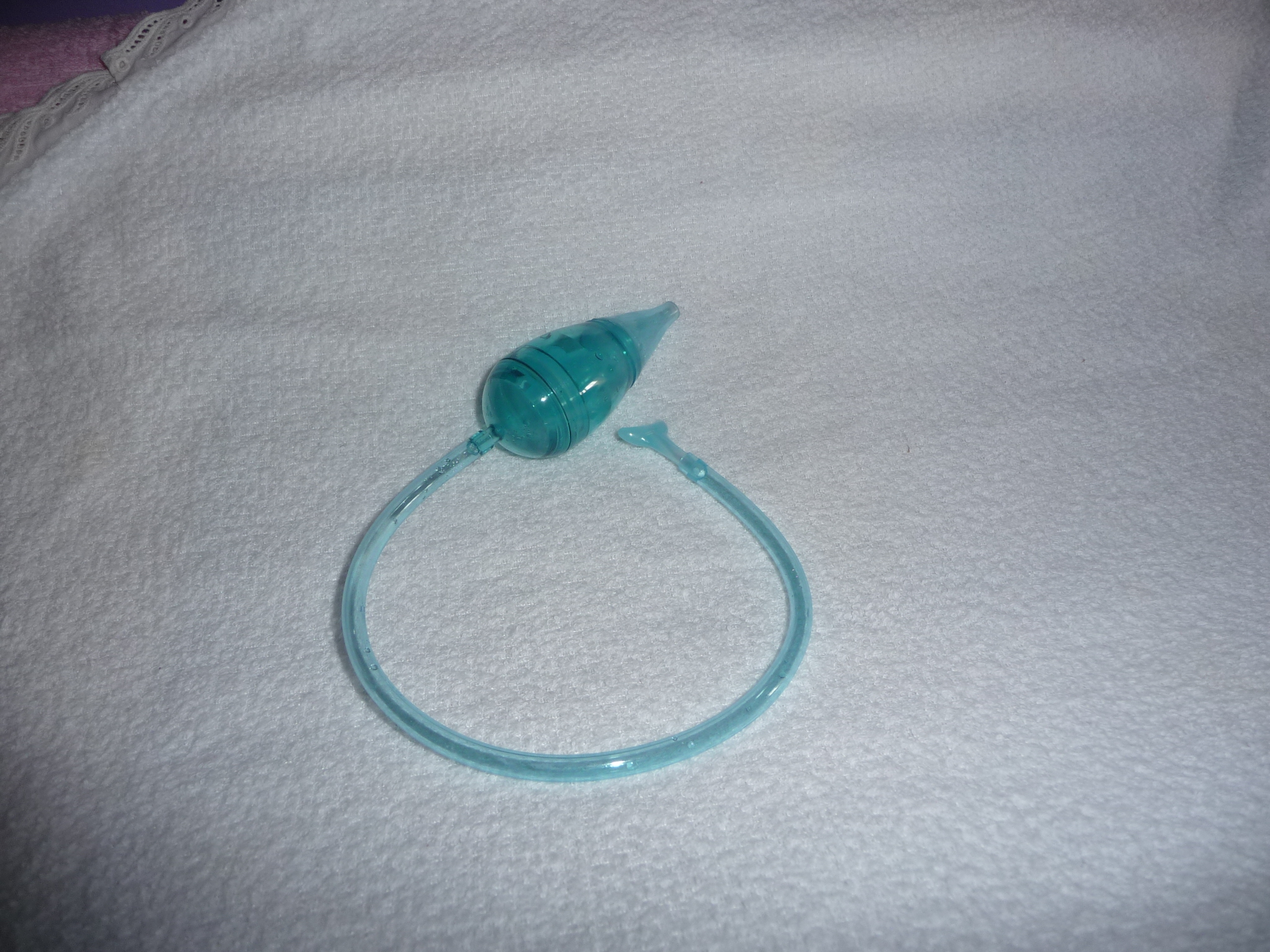
Suction traps that works by inhalation

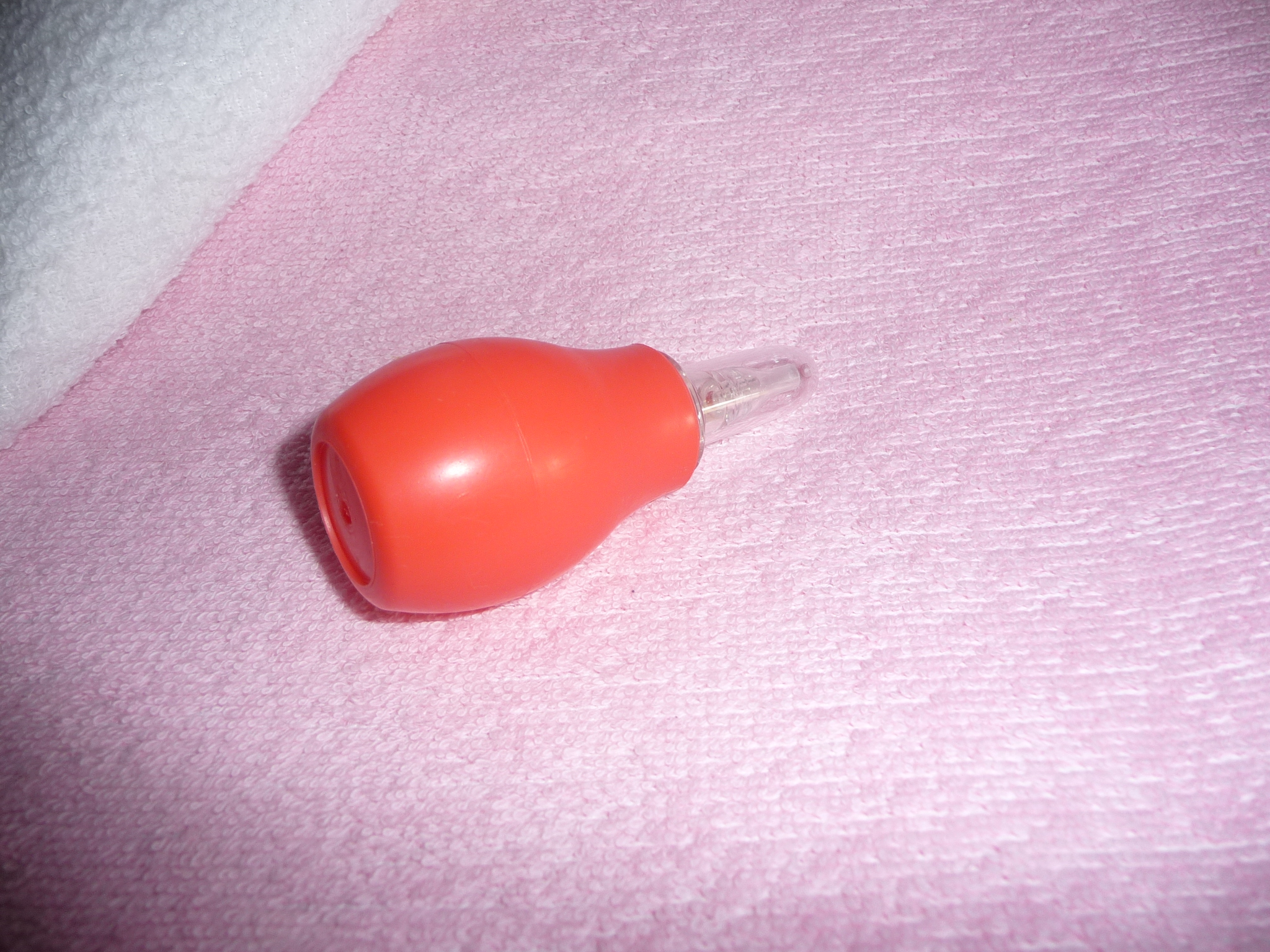
Pump-powered suction trap

A suction trap in medicine is a machine that uses air to suck liquid or mucus. It is widely used to extract mucus from recently born babies that are unable to do it by themselves.

In entomology, suction traps are funnel-like devices creating an air current that catches small flying arthropods and deposits them in a collecting bin for research. They are used e.g. for monitoring of crop pests.
