= Reticulation =

Reticulation is a net-like pattern, arrangement, or structure.

Reticulation or Reticulated may refer to:

== Biology ==
- Reticulation (single-access key), in biology, a structure of an identification tree, where there are several possible routes to a correct identification
- A coloration pattern of some animals (e.g., the reticulated giraffe)
- An arrangement of veins in a leaf, with the veins interconnected like a network
- The endoplasmic reticulum within a cell, often resembling a net
- A phylogenetic network, the result when hybrid speciation, introgression and paraphyletic speciation is applied to a phylogenetic tree

== Other uses ==
- Reticulated water (Australia, South Africa), water from a piped network, see: wiktionary:reticulated water
  - Reticulation, a type of garden irrigation system
- Reticulation (metalwork), a decorative technique in metalworking

== See also ==
- Reticular (disambiguation)
