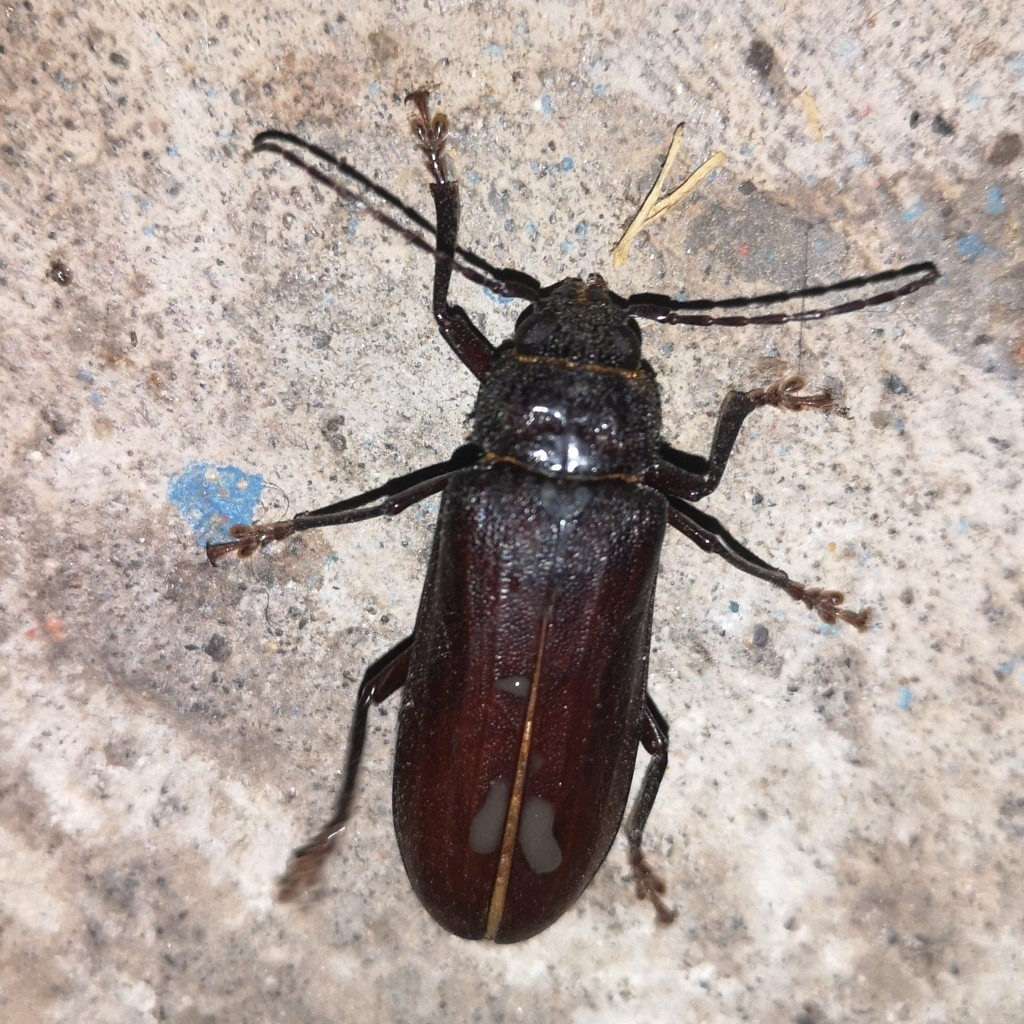

Scientific classification
- Kingdom: Animalia
- Phylum: Arthropoda
- Clade: Pancrustacea
- Class: Insecta
- Order: Coleoptera
- Suborder: Polyphaga
- Infraorder: Cucujiformia
- Family: Cerambycidae
- Subfamily: Prioninae
- Tribe: Macrotomini
- Genus: Chiasmetes; Pascoe, 1867
- Species: C. limae

Binomial name
- Chiasmetes limae (Guérin-Méneville in Duperrey, 1830)

Synonyms
- (Genus): Chiasmus Thomson, 1861; (Species): Mallodon gracilicorne Buquet in Guérin-Méneville, 1844; Macrotoma melitaeques Blanchard, 1843

= Chiasmetes =

Chiasmetes limae

Genus of beetles

Chiasmetes is a genus of South American beetles in the family Cerambycidae. It is monotypic, being represented by the single species, Chiasmetes limae.
