= Reticulation (metalwork) =

Surface finishing technique

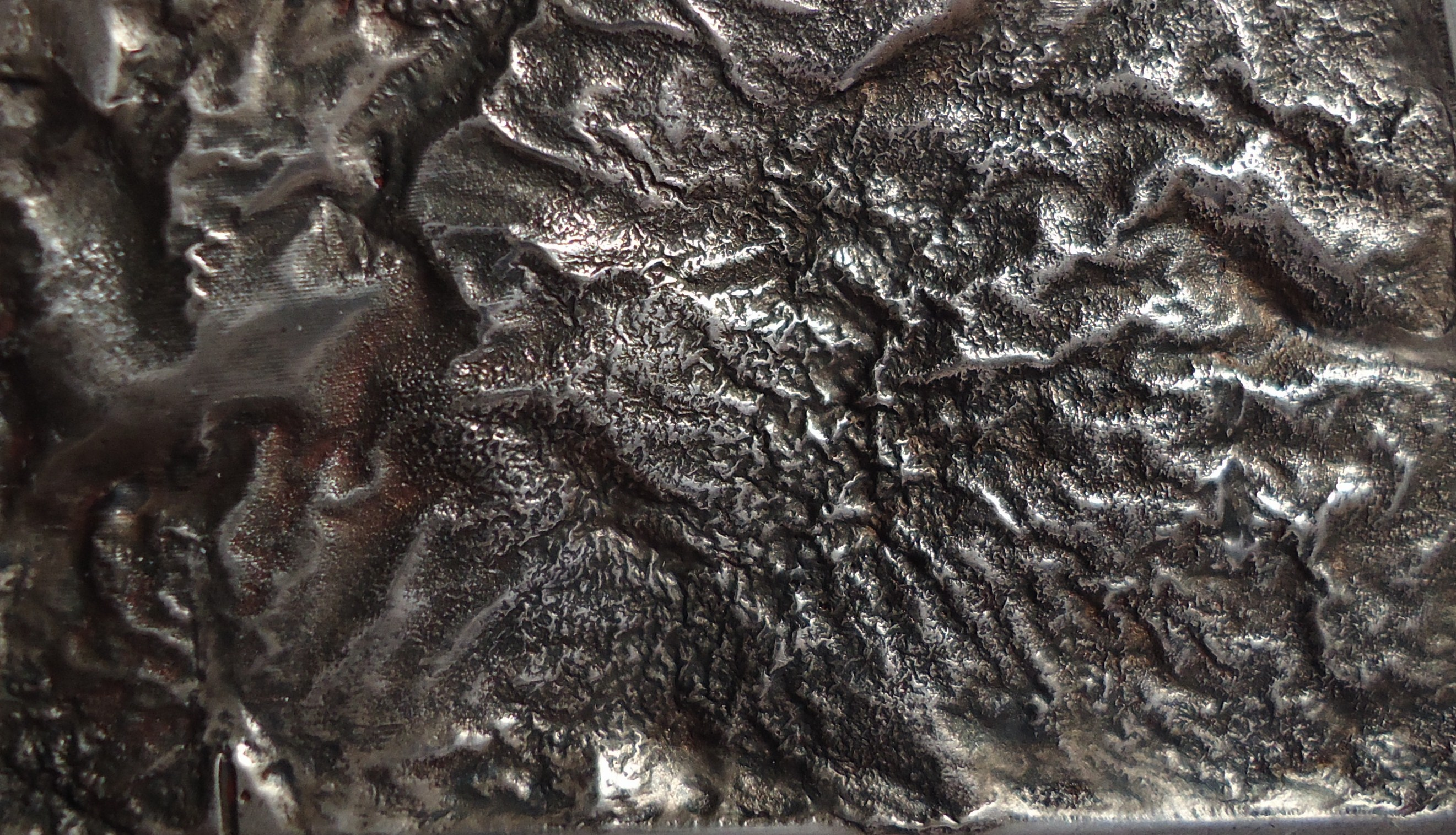
Surface of silver piece featuring reticulation.

In metalwork, reticulation refers to a decorative surface finishing technique involving the application of localised heat to the surface of a metal object. Reticulation is typically performed on alloys of silver and copper or of gold and copper.

Reticulation exploits the difference between the melting temperature of an unalloyed metal and that of an alloy of the metal; by depleting the base metal content in the surface layer, a piece can be heated in such a manner so as to render the interior of the piece molten while leaving the surface of the piece intact. The reticulated surface is formed by the thermal expansion and contraction of the interior metal which is effected by deliberate variation in the application of localised heat.

In the late 19th century, reticulation was used as a decorative technique by Russian goldsmiths such as Fabergé, where the process was referred to as samorodok (lit. "born by itself"). Use of the technique spread to the Nordic and Scandinavian countries where it was applied in the creation of objects such as cigarette boxes, card cases, eyeglass cases, and flasks.
