= National Pedagogic University (Colombia) =

Public normal university in Bogotá, Colombia

Coordinates: 4.65814°N 74.0588°W

- Universidad Pedagógica Nacional
- Motto: Educadora de Educadores
- Motto in English: Educating Educators
- Type: Public normal university
- Established: 1962
- Endowment: February 1, 1955
- Rector: Helberth Augusto Choachí González
- Students: 11,092 (2011)
- Location: Principal Cll 72 11-86 Other: Sede de Bienestar Universitario Cll 73 14-27/21 Sede El Nogal Cll 78 9-92 Centro Cultural Gabriel Betancourt Mejía Cra 15 72-90 oficina 201 Valmaría Cll 183-Cra 54D, Bogotá, Cundinamarca, Colombia
- Colors: Blue and White
- Website: upn.edu.co

The National Pedagogic University (Spanish: Universidad Pedagógica Nacional) is a national public normal university in Bogotá, Colombia. The university is under the Ministry of National Education of Colombia and began academic works as a female education institution. In 1962, it acquired a national and joint character.

It offers 20 undergraduate academic programs and 19 graduate, within which is the only doctorate in education offered in the country, in agreement with the Universidad del Valle and Universidad Distrital Francisco José de Caldas.

The National Pedagogic University has the principal goal of integral teacher training through a coherent educational plan based on the principles underlying its nature and rationale. teach excellence, quality, equity, membership and academic rigor of the training programs and processes in teaching, research and extension. That is because of its slogan "Educating Educators". The university has received the high quality institutional accreditation by the Ministry of Education in 2016.

== History ==
The university is a chapter in Colombian history linked to the development of education, for their contribution to teacher training in different areas of knowledge and research, production and dissemination of national educational thinking. It was created by the National Pedagogical Institute was founded in 1927 in an effort to provide higher education to students graduating from the Institute. After a few years, the University ceased to be dependent on the school, and now has control and autonomous economic administration.

By Act 30 of 1992 and the General Law of Education was consecrated as the institution advises the Ministry of National Education regarding educational policies for teacher training, as well as a result of historical development, its contribution to the country with about 20,000 professionals in education Undergraduate and Postgraduate levels and the heritage they inherited from these institutions is configured as an entity capable of developing an organizational culture that will allow collect the pedagogical tradition of this century, to the extent that it has been important player in the process of teacher training, assimilating critically the various historical experiences and reworked in accordance with the current conditions.

== Academic programs ==
The Faculties of the National Pedagogical University is an academic and administrative structure that depend on the Vice-Rector Academic. It currently has five colleges that offer academic programs to undergraduate and postgraduate courses covering the areas of pedagogical knowledge.

=== Facultad de Humanidades (Faculty of Humanities) ===
- Licenciatura en Educación Básica con énfasis en Ciencias Sociales (Primary Education with emphasis in Social Sciences)
- Licenciatura en Educación Básica con énfasis en Humanidades: Español y Lenguas Extranjeras (Primary Education with an emphasis on Humanities: Spanish and Foreign Languages)
- Licenciatura en Educación Básica con énfasis en Humanidades: Español e Inglés (Primary Education with an emphasis on Humanities: English and Spanish)
- Licenciatura en Filosofía (To be teacher of Philosophy)

=== Facultad de Ciencia y Tecnología (Faculty of Science and Technology) ===
- Licenciatura en Química (To be teacher of Chemistry)
- Licenciatura en Biología(To be teacher of Biology)
- Licenciatura en Física (To be teacher of Physics)
- Licenciatura en Electrónica (To be teacher of Electronics)
- Licenciatura en Matemáticas (To be teacher of Maths)
- Licenciatura en Diseño Tecnológico (To be teacher of Design Technology)

=== Facultad de Bellas Artes (Faculty of Fine Arts) ===
- Licenciatura en Música (To be teacher of Music)
- Licenciatura en Artes Escénicas (To be teacher of Performing Arts)
- Licenciatura en Artes Visuales (To be teacher of Visual Arts)

=== Facultad de Educación (Faculty of Education) ===
- Licenciatura en Educación Infantil (Early Childhood Education)
- Licenciatura en Educación con énfasis Educación Especial (Education with Special Education emphasis)
- Licenciatura en Psicología y Pedagogía (To be teacher of Psychology and Pedagogy)
- Licenciatura en Educación Comunitaria con énfasis en Derechos Humanos (Community Education with emphasis on Human Rights)
- Programa en Pedagogía (Pedagogy degree)

=== Facultad de Educación física (Faculty of Physical Education) ===
- Licenciatura en Educación Física (To be teacher of Physical Education)
- Licenciatura en Deporte (To be teacher of Sports)
- Licenciatura en Recreación (To be teacher of Recreation)

== Pedagogical University and the National Development Plan ==
Some professors at the National Pedagogical University, concerned about the consequences of the National Development Plan for Higher Education, have prepared a document that states the obvious deterioration of university education in Colombia. This deterioration is due to the current government's position on economic development, which has led it to adopt neoliberal economic policies that have affected public education. Furthermore, pursuing such policies in the future would cause even more privatization of public universities.

== Colombian Pedagogical Museum ==
It is an institutional project created in 2004, it is part of the Faculty of Education and the Academic Vice Rector of the National Pedagogical University. Currently also included in the Center for the Memory of Education and Pedagogy14, constituting an important space for educational research and dissemination, with activities such as exhibitions and conferences related to the history and memory of Education in Colombia, of the National Pedagogical Institute. and the National Pedagogical University. In this Museum are:

- Photographic archive, and film archive of the history and memory of education.
- Pedagogical Archive of Colombia.
- Bibliographic documentary collection: (Newspaper library, databases, school manuals).
- Exhibitions on institutional memory, education in Colombia and pieces related to education in the country.

== See also ==
- List of universities in Colombia
- Education in Colombia
