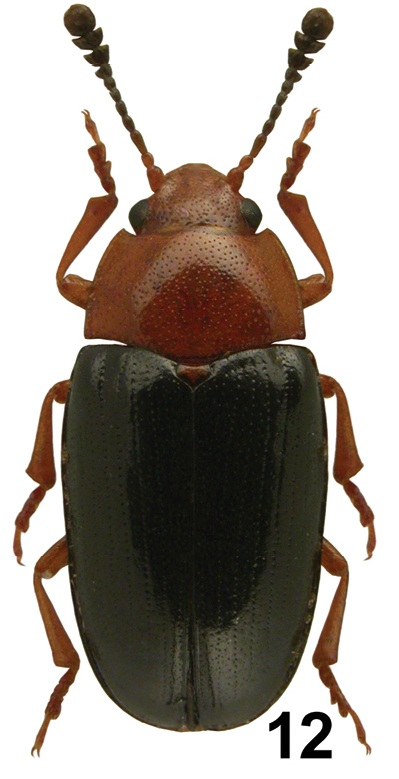

Scientific classification
- Kingdom: Animalia
- Phylum: Arthropoda
- Clade: Pancrustacea
- Class: Insecta
- Order: Coleoptera
- Suborder: Polyphaga
- Infraorder: Cucujiformia
- Family: Erotylidae
- Genus: Triplax
- Species: T. russica

Binomial name
- Triplax russica (Linnaeus, 1758)

Synonyms
- Numerous, see text

= Triplax russica =

Species of beetle

Triplax russica is a species of pleasing fungus beetle (family Erotylidae). This species is found in Europe and adjacent regions such as Siberia and North Africa. They inhabit deciduous woodlands and parklands.

== Description ==
Adults reach a length of 5-6.5 mm. The elytra and the underside of the thorax are black, but the rest of the body and legs are orange.

Historically, it has also been claimed to occur in North America, but these records are misidentifications of the very similar American relative Triplax macra. Both of these species have an almost rectangular pronotum whose rear edge is one-third again as wide at the front, a forehead that is notably concave on the sides between the antennae, which are entirely dark (except for the barely visible first two segments) with a wide "club" (with segment 10 three times as wide as segment 7) and a "stalk" bearing moderately dense coarse black bristles. The epistome has sharply impressed margins at the sides which are set at almost right angles to the concave tip. All adults of either species possess file-like structures at the sides of the neck attachment, which, when the beetle wiggles its head, rub against the chitin and produce a squeaking sound. The tibiae of their legs are somewhat widened towards the ends, particularly notable on the forelegs.

However, a clear distinguishing trait is the black underside of the thorax of T.russica, whereas T.macra has an all-orange underside. T.russica also has smaller "cheek" lobes than T.macra, similar in size to those of the North American T.thoracica and not reaching the inner margins of the compound eyes when seen from below. Its mentum is comparatively huge, and the last segment of the maxillary palps is small and rather narrow, only twice as wide as it is long, with the tiny brush at the tip hidden and only visible at the sides.

The aedeagus of the male genitalia has lateral lobes which attach under the tip of the basal piece; the lateral struts forward of the basal piece abruptly expand into conspicuously wide arms which are slightly fused at the front and membranous at the underside. The median lobe is strongly curved, with a tipwards membrane at the back surrounding a hole in the center, and (like in the American T.frontalis, but unlike in T.macra) has a bulge on the underside near the tip. The internal sac has a small muscle attachment at the front end, and compared to T.macra is shorter and lacks sclerotized patches above the ejaculatory duct. The female genitalia are fairly generic, resembling those of other Erotylidae such as Megalodacne, which within the pleasing fungus beetle family is not particularly closely related to Triplax. Compared to the North American species, the genital tube is shortened, but equally wide.

== Systematics ==
T.russica is the type species of genus Triplax. When Linnaeus first described it in 1758, he mistook it for a carrion beetles and placed it in genus Silpha. But it was soon noted that this was wrong, and in 1793 Johann Herbst erected the new genus Triplax to contain T.russica and its closest relatives. When subgenera of Triplax are recognized, T.russica, being the genus type, also becomes the type of subgenus Triplax (Triplax).

An Erotylidae COI phylogeny including 9 Triplax species failed to resolve any well-supported relationships between these however; instead, Triplax formed a paraphyletic and probably artefactual assemblage with the closely related Aporotritoma pulchra, Tritoma bipustulata and Ischyrus quadripunctatus, as well as the entire Erotylinae (or Erotylini if Triplax is included in Erotylidae) which resolved as sister to Aporotritima/Tritoma. The study did not aim at understanding relationships among Triplax, but to provide a framework of higher-level Erotylidae lineages; misrooting, long branch attraction or similar errors are likely to have confounded the phylogeny at the species level. Even so, there was a possible clade (albeit only with modest support) involving T.russica, T.lacordairii, and T.aenea; the latter is the type species of subgenus Triplax (Platichna) while T.lacordairii is assigned to Triplax (Triplax). T.aenea might indeed represent a lineage distinct from Triplax (Triplax) on one hand, and from the American T.thoracica and its relatives on the other. Meanwhile, the European T.rufipes, variously placed in Triplax (Triplax) and Triplax (Platichna), unexpectedly wound up as sister taxon of the American T.dissimulator which is generally held to be close to T.thoracica; however, the typical signs of long branch attraction are present here, and moreover the position of T.thoracica was the least certain in the entire phylogeny.

=== Synonyms ===
In particular around 1800, when European entomologists were producing comprehensive lists of the beetles of their native countries, T.russica was described as supposedly new species again and again, aided by the fact that Linnaeus' description was misleading had misinterpreted its affiliations. For example, Charles De Geer described specimens from Russia (which at that time extended further west than today) as a supposed fungus weevil, Johan Fabricius described European material from an unspecified locality as a bark beetle, Franz von Paula Schrank placed German specimens with the leaf beetles, and Thomas Marsham described the English population – as Linnaeus did – as a carrion beetle. As late as 1873, Edouard Perris distinguished T.russica specimens from Landes in France as a supposedly new Triplax species – but the name he used had already been employed some 30 years earlier for another member of this genus by Jean Lacordaire. All these supposedly distinct species are nowadays recognized as based on individual variation, such as individuals caught soon after emerging from the pupa (when the exoskeleton is still soft and light-colored), or very old ones (which are very dark and have a worn-off smooth and shiny exoskeleton), and subsumed into T.russica. A form with aberrant coloration was described by Jan Roubal in 1934 as Triplax russica f. flavoscutellata, based on specimens from northern Iran.

Invalid junior synonyms or T.russica are:

- Anthribus ruber De Geer, 1775
- Anthribus rubra (lapsus)
- Chrysomela palliata Schranck, 1798
- Ips nigripennis Fabricius, 1793
- Silpha castanea Marsham, 1802
- Silpha russica Linnaeus, 1758
- Triplax castanea (Marsham, 1802) non Peyerimhoff, 1925
- Triplax elongata Perris, 1873, nec Lacordaire, 1842: preoccupied
- Triplax flavoscutellata Roubal, 1934
- Triplax nigripennis (Fabricius, 1793)
- Triplax palliata (Schranck, 1798)
- Triplax rubra (De Geer, 1775)
- Tritoma nigripennis (Fabricius, 1793) non Motschulsky, 1858
- Tritoma russica (Linnaeus, 1758)
