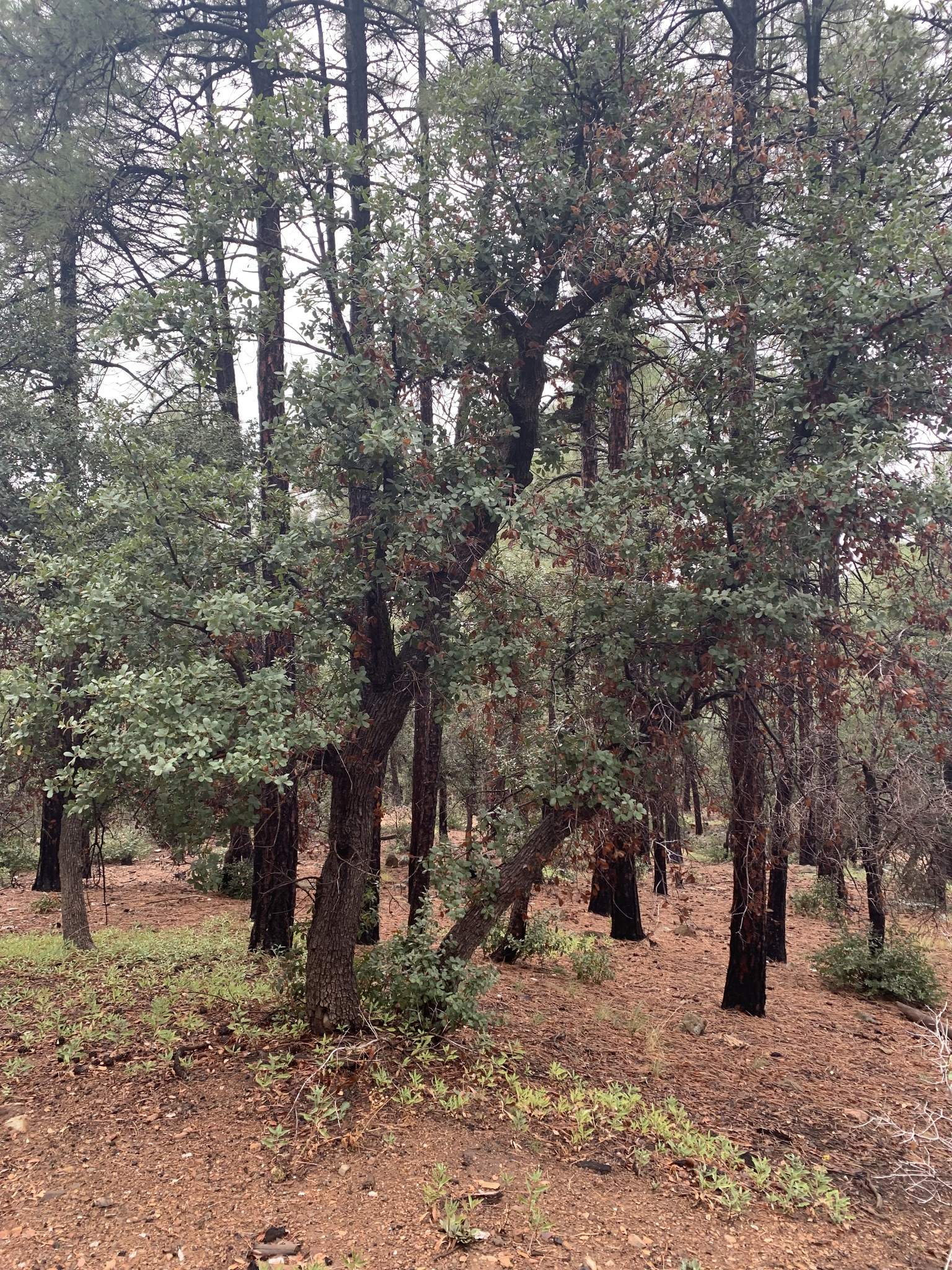

Conservation status
- Least Concern (IUCN 3.1)

- Secure (NatureServe)

Scientific classification
- Kingdom: Plantae
- Clade: Tracheophytes
- Clade: Angiosperms
- Clade: Eudicots
- Clade: Rosids
- Order: Fagales
- Family: Fagaceae
- Genus: Quercus
- Subgenus: Quercus subg. Quercus
- Section: Quercus sect. Quercus
- Species: Q. arizonica

Binomial name
- Quercus arizonica Sarg.
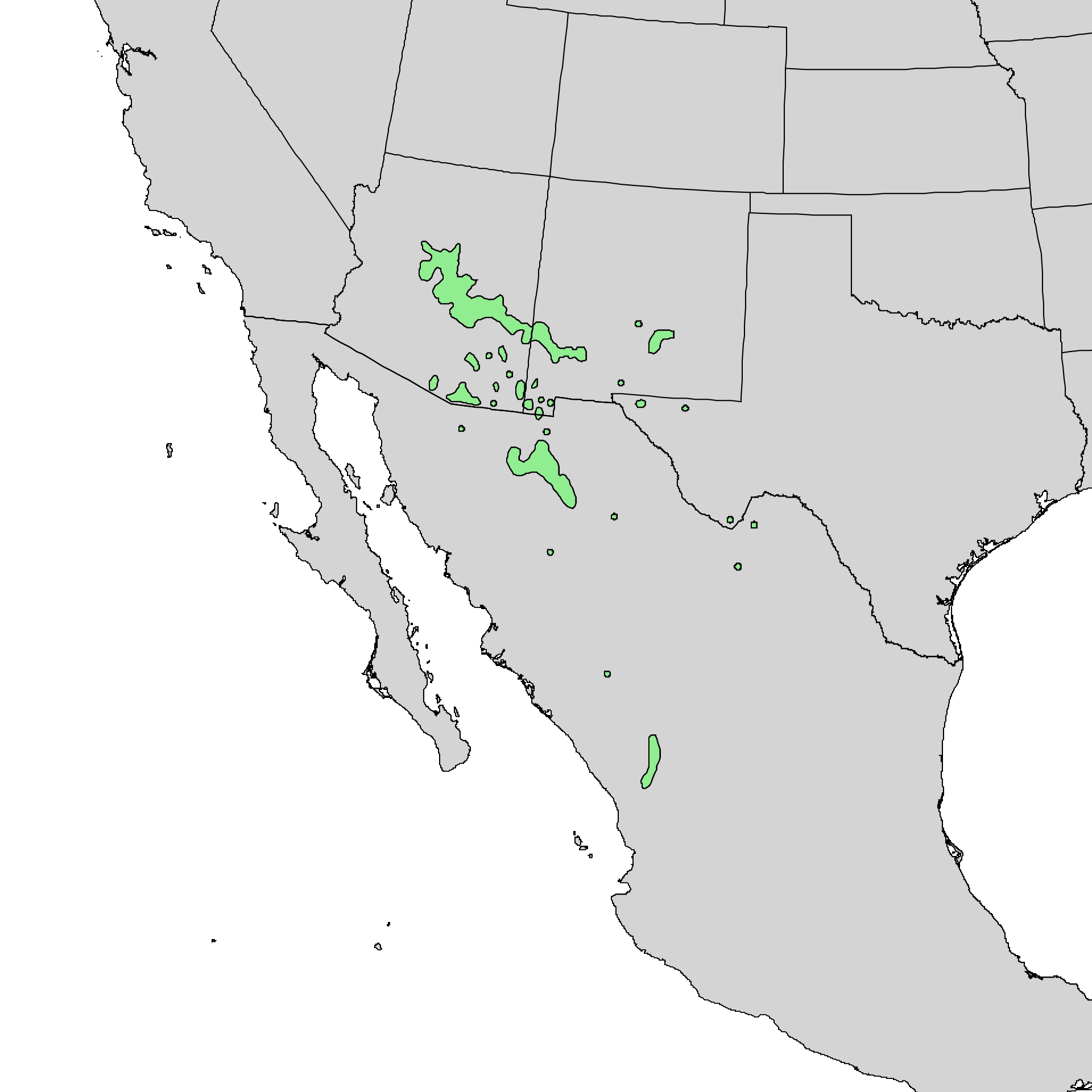

Synonyms
- Quercus arizonica var. wootonii Trel.; Quercus endemica C.H.Mull.; Quercus sacame Trel.

= Quercus arizonica =

Arizona white oak

Species of oak tree

Quercus arizonica, the Arizona white oak, is a North American tree species in the beech family. It is found in Arizona, New Mexico, western Texas, Sonora, Chihuahua, Coahuila, Sinaloa, and Durango.

== Description ==
The Arizona white oak is one of the largest southwestern oaks. This tree may grow to 60 feet (18 meters), with a trunk diameter of 1 m (3 ft 3 in). It has stout branches and a spreading crown. The leaves are about 8 centimetres (3 1/4 inches) long, thick, and evergreen. It grows very slowly once it has become mature, adding approximately 0.25 cm (3/32 in) of diameter per year.

- Bark: color is light grayish. The bark is initially thin and lenticelled, but later becomes quite thick, with shallow fissures and scaly ridges.
- Twig: medium-sized, fuzzy. The color can be light brown or reddish brown. Twigs have pointy and fat clusters of terminal buds.
- Leaves: alternate, evergreen, simple, and oblong. The color is yellowish green or bluish green. Leaves are usually 1 1/2 to 3 1/2 in long. The margins are usually entire or toothed and are rounded at the base. The texture of the leaves is leathery and stiff. The veins are parallel, sunken on the upper side, and raised underneath. Leaves may begin to shed in late winter, or when new leaves emerge in spring.
- Fruit: oblong acorn that is 1/2 to 1 in long. Acorns have bowl-shaped caps that cover one third of the nut. Acorns usually mature in autumn. The quantity of acorns produced can vary year to year, producing about 32,000 acorns one year and very few the next. Germination of acorns is highly correlated with the amount of moisture during the rainy season.
- Flowers: monoecious, meaning that male and female organs occur in different flowers on the same tree. Female flowers occur as small spikes in the leaf axils. Male flowers are long, drooping, yellowish green catkins.

== Distribution and habitat ==
The Arizona white oak can be found in a vast array of habitats such as savannas, grasslands, and chaparrals. They are usually found in mountain-like areas that are above about 5,495 ft (1,675 m) in elevation. Water use is low and it requires sun or part shade. Soil moisture must be dry, and the soil must be rocky or sandy. Soils may be clay loam, clay, medium loam, or rocky. The Arizona white oak is both heat and cold tolerant.

== Ecology ==
=== Fire ===
When Arizona white oaks are small, they usually die by fire. The acorns are often killed by fires as well. The foliage is extremely flammable but larger trees usually survive fires that are not as severe. If a stump survives a fire, it will sprout rapidly afterwards.

=== Threats ===
The wood decaying fungus Inonotus andersonii affects the Arizona white oak negatively. Burning and herbicide treatment has also affected the growth of the Arizona white oak, so they are being managed by pinyon-juniper silvicultural systems.

== Uses ==
The wood is usually used for fuel. Since the wood of the Arizona white oak is hard, heavy, and strong, it is rarely used for commercial reasons such as furniture production.

The Arizona white oak provides cover for such animals like deer, turkeys, javelinas, desert sheep, songbirds, and quail. The white tailed deer is also known to utilize it for cover. For white-tailed and mule deer, the Arizona white oak is highly palatable as well. The only species known to consume the acorns in quantity is the thick-billed parrot.

The Arizona white oak can also be used as an ornamental plant.

== Gallery ==
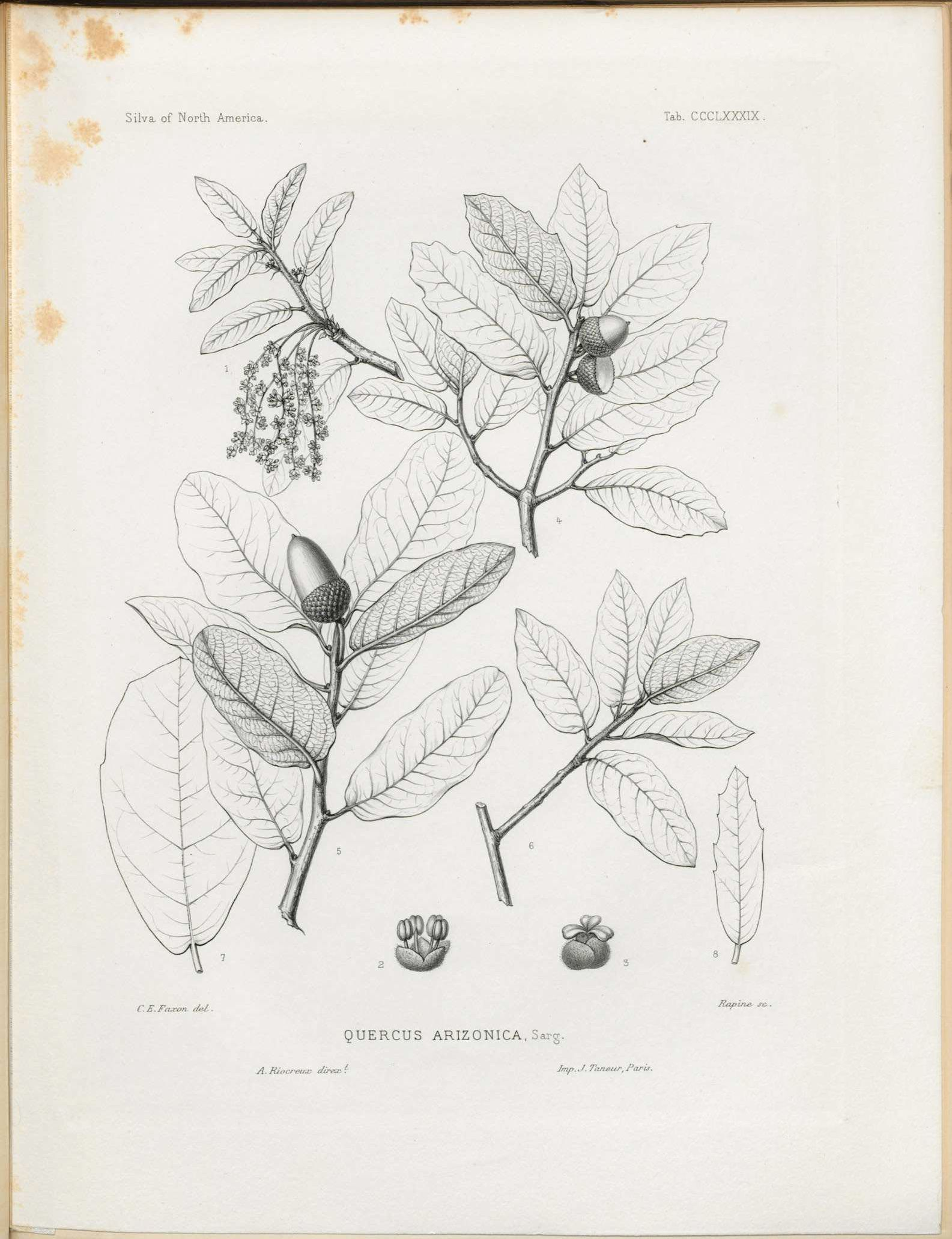
Scientific illustration

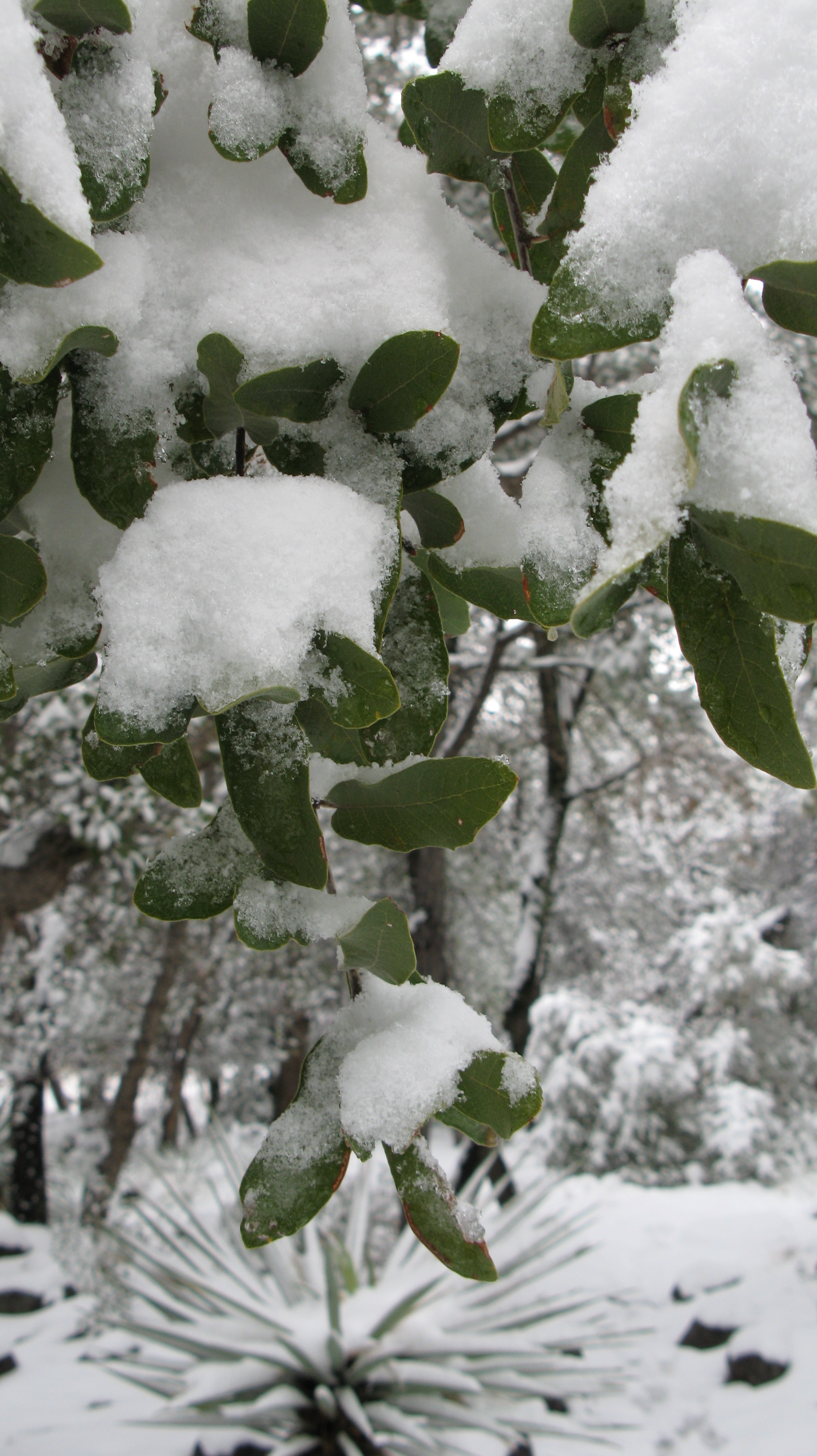
The tree in snow.
