= Triplax macra =

Scientific classification
- Kingdom: Animalia
- Phylum: Arthropoda
- Clade: Pancrustacea
- Class: Insecta
- Order: Coleoptera
- Suborder: Polyphaga
- Infraorder: Cucujiformia
- Family: Erotylidae
- Genus: Triplax
- Species: T. macra

Binomial name
- Triplax macra LeConte, 1854

Species of beetle

Triplax macra is a small North American species of pleasing fungus beetle (family Erotylidae). It is placed in subfamily Tritominae (formerly Triplacinae), or – in taxonomic arrangements that prefer a more comprehensive subfamily Erotylinae – in tribe Tritomini of the Erotylinae.

It is suspected to form a cryptic species complex with its relatives T.alachuae, T.festiva, T.frontalis and T.marcescens.

== Description ==
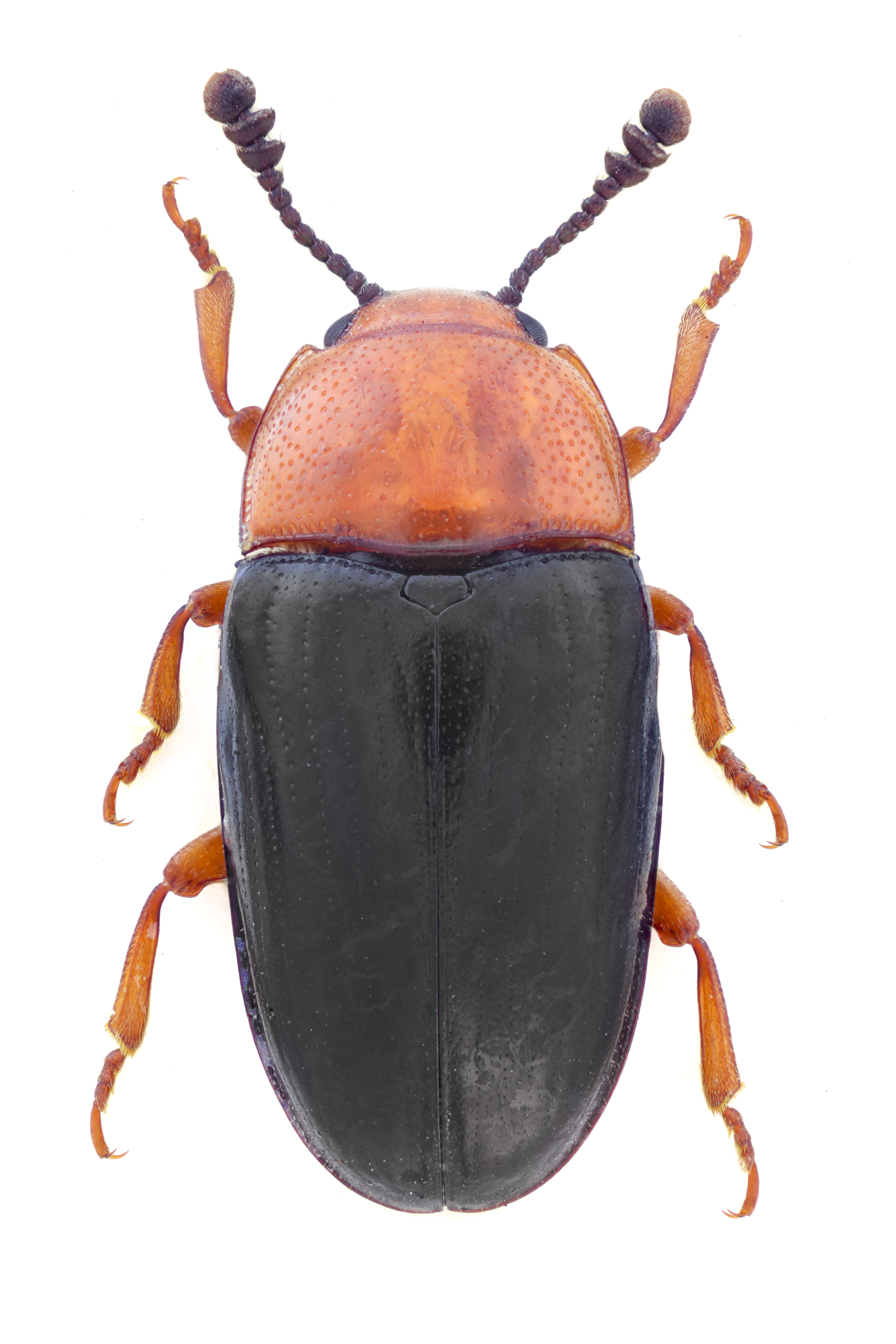
The Old World species Triplax russica has been confused with T.macra; seen from above like here, they only differ in the punctures on the pronotum

Adults of this beetle are roughly 5-6.5 mm long and 2-2.8 mm wide, with an elongated and almost parallel-sided body. Like in many of their relatives, the elytra and the "clubs" of the antennae are black. The scutellum and the "stalk" of the antennae are blackish-brown, shading to reddish-brown towards the (barely visible) base of the antennae. The head, pronotum, legs and underside are orange. As usual for the members of it species complex, it can be distinguished from less closely related Triplax (such as the T.thoracica species complex, which it resembles in general appearance) by the dark antennae and a pronounced narrow margin to the forehead sides, which forms a roughly 90-degree angle to the tip.

The European Triplax russica has historically been claimed to also occur in North America; however, these specimens are misidentified T.macra. An obvious distinguishing trait is the black underside of the thorax of T.russica, whereas T.macra has an all-orange underside. T.russica also has smaller "cheek" lobes than T.macra, similar in size to those of the North American T.thoracica and not reaching the inner margins of the compound eyes when seen from below. The mentum of T.macra is much smaller than the comparatively huge mentum of T.russica, whose last segment of its maxillary palps is small and rather narrow, only twice as wide as it is long, with the tiny brush at the tip hidden and only visible at the sides – unlike T.macra, whose last maxillary palp segment is much wider, with the brush at the tip not hidden. Also, the two differ in the anatomical detaills of its genitalia.

Head
The head has small compound eyes with tiny ommatidia, indicating a diurnal or crepuscular lifestyle, but with overall rather little reliance on eyesight. All T.macra adults possess file-like structures at the sides of the neck attachment, which, when the beetle wiggles its head, rub against the chitin and produce a squeaking sound; these structures are developed similarly to those of, e.g., the unrelated pleasing fungus beetle Dacne pubescens, in being entirely covered by the pronotum. Seen from above, the sides of the forehead are notably concave between the antenna attachments. The epistome has narrow margins at the sides, which are formed by a continuation of the ocular stripes and set at an almost 90-degree angle to the unmargined concave front edge of the epistome. The "cheek" lobes below the compound eyes are well-developed and quite large; their sides are rounded and extend a bit over the compound eyes when seen from below. The antenna length is somewhat more than half of the pronotal base width, with the first two segments short and lighter in color, and segment 3 shorter than the segments 4 and 5 together. The "stalk" of the antennae is rather densely covered in long and coarse black bristles. The "club" at the tip of the antennae has an elongated shape, well twice as long as it is wide; it starts abruptly with segment 9, its middle (segment 10) is three times as wide as segments 7 and 8.

As for the mouthparts, the galea and lacinia of the maxilla resemble those of the related genus Tritoma, the galea being almost triangular, with a tip carrying sparse bristles at the outer side and a dense pack of bristles on the inner side. The lacinia is also covered in dense bristles, and – unlike in Tritoma – at the tip has two small black incurved teeth, set so closely together that they may appear as a single tooth. The maxillary palps curve inwards and have a first segment as long as segments 2 and 3 together. Their end segment is somewhat triangular, several times as wide as it is long, and abruptly cut off and slightly hollowed out at the tip. Along the entire tip runs a prominently developed small brush. It consists of a single row of microscopic fleshy finger-like cylinders, which on their sides have many small bristles. The labium has a rather narrow mentum, which is more or less angular, varying between individuals. The labial palps end in a widened hatchet-shaped segment, which is sparsely covered in short bristles, with a longer strong bristle at the outer side. At its tip, it has a tiny brush, much smaller than that at the end of the maxillary palps, and composed of a single row of short smooth nubs.

Body, wings and legs
The prothorax is almost as wide at the base as the wings at their widest point. The pronotum is wide by the genus's standards and almost rectangular, at the rear about one-third wider than on the front. A thin margin runs around the weakly curving sides and the rear of the pronotum, but is absent from the front between the compound eyes. The pronotum has a sparse scattering of extremely tiny punctures, 3-5 times their diameter apart from each other. In each corner of the pronotum, there is a conspicuous navel-shaped pore. The prosternum has no obvious lengthwise lines from the center margin of the leg attachments to the rear. On the metasternum, the lines between the leg attachments are at best vestigial. On the base of the abdomen, lines between the hindleg attachments run along the tip of the abdomen, which protrudes as a narrow bent process between the hindleg attachments.

The scutellum is bluntly pentagonal, almost heart-shaped. The elytra have a distinct margin at the base; they are ornamented with regular lines of small punctuations, but compared to many relatives these are very shallow, and the space in between flat and unornamented. The attachments of each leg pair are set narrowly together. The tibiae are rather stout and somewhat widened towards the tip (often slightly wider in males, but not reliably so), and have a bluntly rounded upper/outer edge. Segment 4 of the tarsi is reduced, attached to the upper centerside of segment 3, and firmly joined to the base segment 5.

The aedeagus of the male genitalia has very narrow and strongly sclerotized dorsal and lateral struts of the tegmen. The lateral lobes attach under the tip of the basal piece; they are constricted at the base, and have a few bristles at the tip. The lateral struts forward of the basal piece abruptly expand into conspicuously wide arms which are slightly fused at the front and membranous at the underside. The median lobe is strongly curved and compressed, with a tipwards membrane at the back surrounding a hole in the center. It is uniformly wide, the underside not bulging near the tip (as it does in T.russica and the American T.frontalis). The internal sac has a small muscle attachment at the front end, and emerges from the median lobe's hole for about half the length of the median strut. Compared to T.russica is longer and for most of its length has sclerotized patches at its back above the ejaculatory duct. However, these are weak and irregular, hard to make out without staining. The ejaculatory duct is flattened and strongly sclerotized, almost straight, and sticks to the underside of the internal sac, but not very firmly. Its gradually tapering tip reaches roughly to the hole of the median lobe. The female genitalia are fairly generic, resembling those of other Erotylidae such as Megalodacne, which within the pleasing fungus beetle family is not particularly closely related to Triplax. However, the basal segments of the valvifers and the paraprocts are comparatively longer.

== Distribution and ecology ==
The type specimen (sex undetermined, MCZ LeConte collection 6771) bears the remark "Guyot"; this is probably a collector note, as its origin is held to be Maine, not the nearby Mount Guyot. T.macra is restricted to eastern North America, where it occurs from Maine and Ontario to Minnesota, in the south at least to Tennessee and Texas, and west probably to Kansas and the 100th meridian west in Oklahoma; a record from near Pueblo, Colorado, close to the Rocky Mountain foothills, requires clarification.

It is a rather elusive Triplax and possibly naturally rare, with records patchy and the range limits not well known. In the northeast it was reported at least up to Country Harbour, Nova Scotia, and "Merivale" in Ontario – probably either near Smiths Falls or a neighborhood in Ottawa – Canton, New York, Franconia, New Hampshire and Bar Harbor, Maine. In the northwest, it occurs at least to the Gooseberry River and Two Harbors, Minnesota, and in the southwest to Erwin, Tennessee and Dallas, Texas. To what extend it reaches to Gulf of Mexico coast and into Florida is likewise insufficiently known.

Hardly anything is known about its ecology. Presumably, this beetle eats fungi as larva and adults. Most likely it specializes in members of the "conk" genus genus Inonotus (Agaricomycetes: Hymenochaetales: Hymenochaetaceae), as its better-known closest relatives do. It is generally only encountered with some regularity in June to mid-August, when it is easily caught in flight intercept traps, but as far north as Bar Harbor it has been recorded on a September 19.
