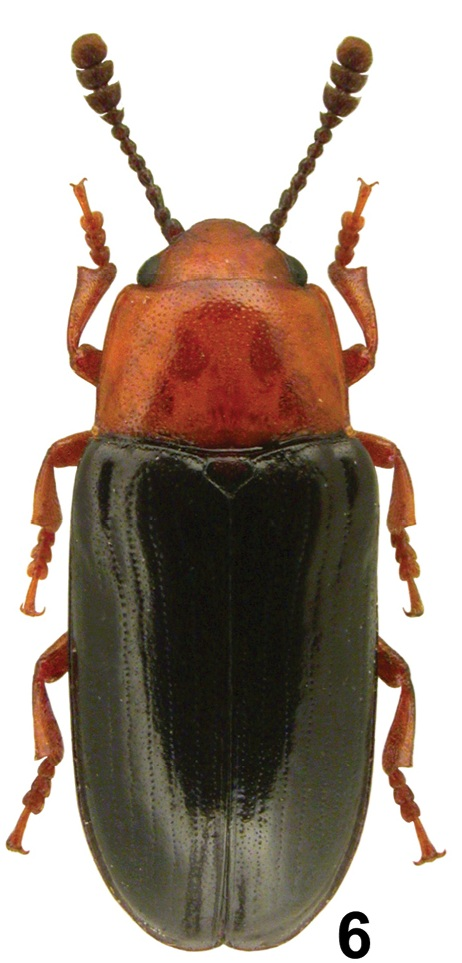

Scientific classification
- Kingdom: Animalia
- Phylum: Arthropoda
- Clade: Pancrustacea
- Class: Insecta
- Order: Coleoptera
- Suborder: Polyphaga
- Infraorder: Cucujiformia
- Family: Erotylidae
- Genus: Triplax
- Species: T. elongata

Binomial name
- Triplax elongata Lacordaire, 1842

Synonyms
- Tritoma elongata (Lacordaire, 1842)

= Triplax elongata =

Species of beetle

As defined by Perris in 1873, the name "Triplax elongata" refers to T.russica.

Triplax elongata is a species of beetle of the Erotylidae family. This species is found in eastern Europe.
