= Triplax marcescens =

Scientific classification
- Kingdom: Animalia
- Phylum: Arthropoda
- Clade: Pancrustacea
- Class: Insecta
- Order: Coleoptera
- Suborder: Polyphaga
- Infraorder: Cucujiformia
- Family: Erotylidae
- Subfamily: Erotylinae
- Genus: Triplax
- Species: T. marcescens

Binomial name
- Triplax marcescens Boyle, 1954

Species of beetle

Triplax marcescens is a small North American species of pleasing fungus beetle (family Erotylidae); as of 2013, it was only certainly known from Arizona, USA. This species is placed in subfamily Tritominae (formerly Triplacinae), or – in taxonomic arrangements that prefer a more comprehensive subfamily Erotylinae – in tribe Tritomini of the Erotylinae.

This species is suspected to belong to the Triplax macra cryptic species complex, which apart from T.macra and T.marcescens also includes T.alachuae, T.festiva and T.frontalis.

== Description ==
Adults of this beetle are about 5.1-5.8 mm long and 2.2-2.7 mm wide, with an elongated and almost parallel-sided body. They are mostly orange, with contrasting black elytra; the antennae are also black except for the base, as are the sides of the mesothorax, the metathorax and abdomen and the coxae and trochanters of the mid- and hindlegs. Strikingly, the pronotum is very glossy, while the elytra surface is covered in a microscopic reticulated relief and shallow irregular fissures that make them contrastingly matte, without any sheen.

T.marcescens can be distinguished from less closely related Triplax (such as the T.thoracica species complex, which it resembles in general appearance) by the dark antennae and a pronounced narrow margin to the forehead sides, which forms a roughly 90-degree angle to the tip. From other members of its species complex, in particular the very similar T.frontalis, it is most easily distinguished by the contrast between the shiny pronotum and the large-punctured dull elytra.

Head
The head has small compound eyes with tiny ommatidia, indicating a diurnal or crepuscular lifestyle, but with overall rather little reliance on eyesight. Presumably, just like their closest relatives do, all T.marcescens adults possess file-like structures at the sides of the neck attachment, which, when the beetle wiggles its head, rub against the chitin and produce a squeaking sound. These are probably developed similarly to those of, e.g., the unrelated pleasing fungus beetle Dacne pubescens, in being entirely covered by the pronotum. Seen from above, the sides of the forehead are notably concave between the antenna attachments. The epistome has narrow margins at the sides, which are formed by a continuation of the ocular stripes and set at an almost 90-degree angle to the unmargined concave front edge of the epistome. The "cheek" lobes below the compound eyes are well-developed and quite large; their sides conspicuously overlap the margin of the compound eyes when seen from below. The antenna length is somewhat more than half of the pronotal base width, with the first two segments short and lighter in color, and segment 3 shorter than the segments 4 and 5 together. The "stalk" of the antennae is rather densely covered in long and coarse black bristles. The "club" at the tip of the antennae has an elongated shape, more than twice as long as it is wide; it starts with the moderately widened segment 9 (segment 8 bering barely widened at the tip), its middle (segment 10) is twice as wide as segment 7 and only maringally longer.

As for the mouthparts, the galea and lacinia of the maxilla resemble those of the related genus Tritoma, the galea being almost triangular, with a tip carrying sparse bristles at the outer side and a dense pack of bristles on the inner side. The lacinia is also covered in dense bristles, and – unlike in Tritoma – at the tip has two small black incurved teeth, set so closely together that they may appear as a single tooth. The maxillary palps curve inwards and have a first segment as long as segments 2 and 3 together. Their end segment is somewhat triangular, several times as wide as it is long, and abruptly cut off at the tip. Along the entire tip runs a well-developed small brush. It consists of a single row of microscopic fleshy finger-like cylinders, which on their sides have many small bristles. The labium has a rather narrow mentum, which is more or less angular, varying between individuals. The labial palps end in a widened hatchet-shaped segment, which is sparsely covered in short bristles, with a longer strong bristle at the outer side. At its tip, it has a tiny brush, much smaller than that at the end of the maxillary palps, and composed of a single row of short smooth nubs.

Body, wings and legs
The prothorax is almost as wide at the base as the wings at their widest point. The pronotum is wide by the genus's standards and almost rectangular, at the rear about one-third wider than on the front. A thin margin runs around the weakly curving sides and the rear of the pronotum, but is absent from the front between the compound eyes. The pronotum has rather large punctures, about as far from each other as they are wide. In each corner of the pronotum, there is a conspicuous navel-shaped pore. The prosternum has no obvious lengthwise lines from the center margin of the leg attachments to the rear. On the metasternum, the lines between the leg attachments are at best vestigial. On the base of the abdomen, lines between the hindleg attachments run along the tip of the abdomen, which protrudes as a narrow bent process between the hindleg attachments.

The scutellum is bluntly pentagonal, almost heart-shaped. The elytra have a distinct margin at the base; they are ornamented with weakly impressed regular lines which consist of conspicuously large punctuations, which are sharply marked and set at a considerable distance from each other. The attachments of each leg pair are set narrowly together. The tibiae are rather stout and somewhat widened towards the tip (often slightly wider in males, but not reliably so), and have a bluntly rounded upper/outer edge. Segment 4 of the tarsi is reduced, attached to the upper centerside of segment 3, and firmly joined to the base segment 5.

The male genitalia were unknown when the species was described, the type specimen being a female. Presumably, like in related species the aedeagus has very narrow and strongly sclerotized dorsal and lateral struts of the tegmen. The lateral lobes probably attach under the tip of the basal piece, and have a few bristles at the tip. The median lobe is likely strongly curved and compressed, with a tipwards membrane at the back surrounding a hole in the center, with its tip and the internal sac probably having a species-specific shape. The internal sac presumably has a small muscle attachment at the front end and might have sclerotized stripes at its back run, possibly hard to make out without staining. The ejaculatory duct is probably also shaped characteristically. The female genitalia are fairly generic, resembling those of other Erotylidae such as Megalodacne, which within the pleasing fungus beetle family is not particularly closely related to Triplax. However, the basal segments of the valvifers and the paraprocts are comparatively longer, and the styli are narrowed. Also, the apodeme is Y-shaped, splitting into two rods where it attaches to the eighth sternite; these rods extend sidewards almost to the central side edges of the sternite.

== Range and ecology ==
As far as is known, T.marcescens is endemic to Arizona, USA, but it might range into Mexico. Described only in the mid-20th century, it is still very little known. The type specimen is a female (Hubbard/Schwarz collection 62003 at the USNM), collected on June 14 in the Santa Rita Mountains in southeastern Arizona. An August 12 record of this species is from the Huachuca Mountains somewhat to the east.

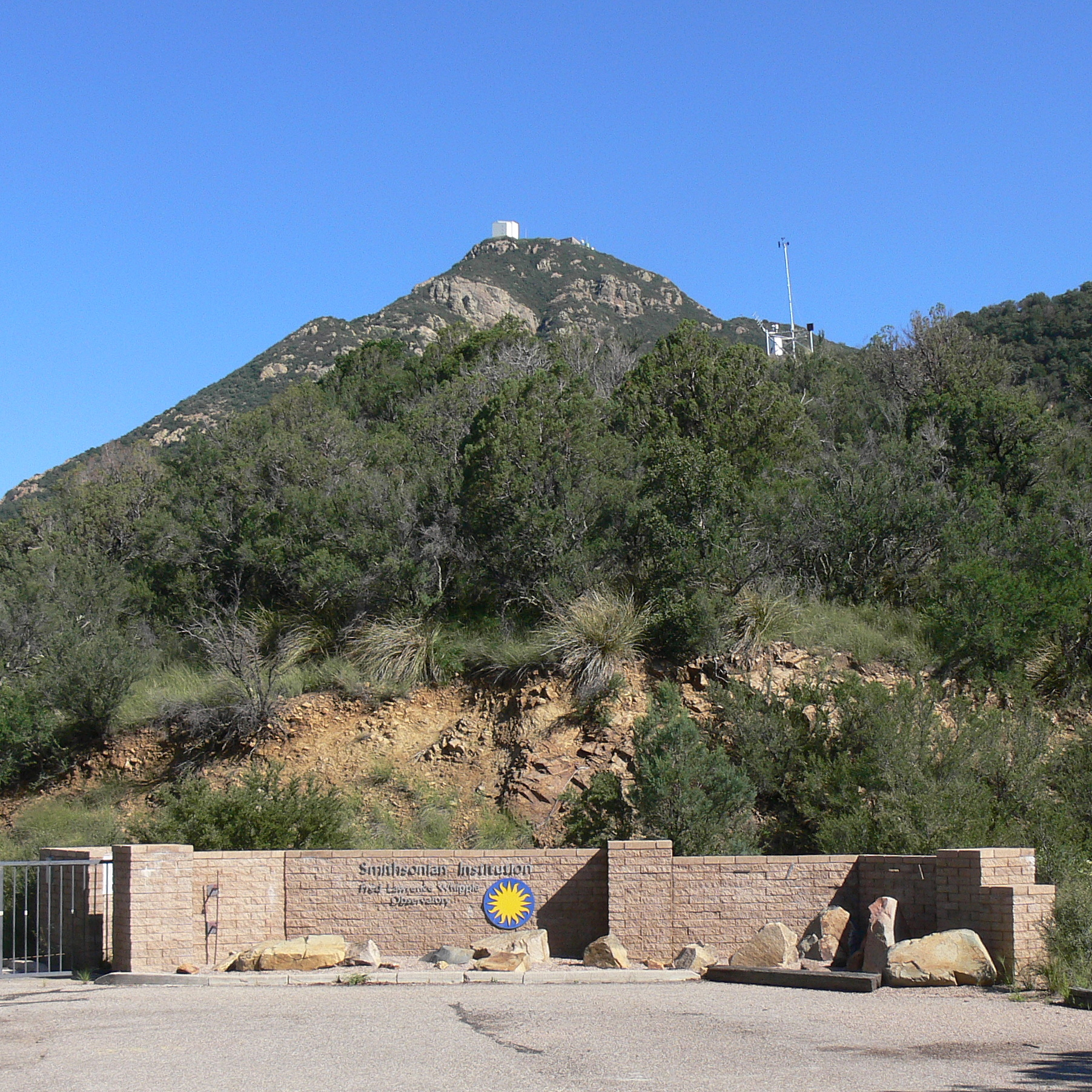
Entrance to the Whipple Observatory, one of the collection localities of T.marcescens

There is also a report from near Colorado Springs in the eastern Rocky Mountain foothills, which is spurious due to being in a widely distinct ecoregion. A more recent specimen is in the TAMU insect collection; it was found on July 26 2013 on roadside vegetation at the Whipple Observatory compound gate (31°40'28"N 110°52'48"W), at 7,090 ft (2,160 m) AMSL on the southern spur of Mount Hopkins, the highest peak of the Santa Rita Mountains, between Montosa Canyon and Josephine Canyon.

Some other enigmatic and little-known Tritominae (or Tritomini) are recorded from the same general region: Mycotretus nigromanicatus and Haematochiton carbonarius (which generally inhabit altitudes of 4,000-6,500 ft/1,200-2,000 m or a bit higher), as well as the mountaintop specialist H.elateroides which does not seem to range much below 8,000 ft/2,500 m. They all inhabit the "sky island" mountains that rise at the boundary of the Chihuahuan and Sonoran Desert, catching moisture and growing a northernly extension of the Sierra Madre Occidental pine–oak forests. All three are confirmed to range south into Mexico, where H.carbonarius is found in upland dry forest but H.elateroides inhabits the same type of mountaintop pine-oak forest as it does in Arizona.

Hardly anything is known about its ecology. Presumably, this beetle eats fungi as larva and adults. Possibly it specializes in members of the "conk" genus genus Inonotus (Agaricomycetes: Hymenochaetales: Hymenochaetaceae), as its better-known closest relatives do, but its unusual upland forest habitat in a desert region might indicate different food preferences. Specimens have been collected only in summer so far, in line with other Triplax species which are generally most easily encountered in June to August.
