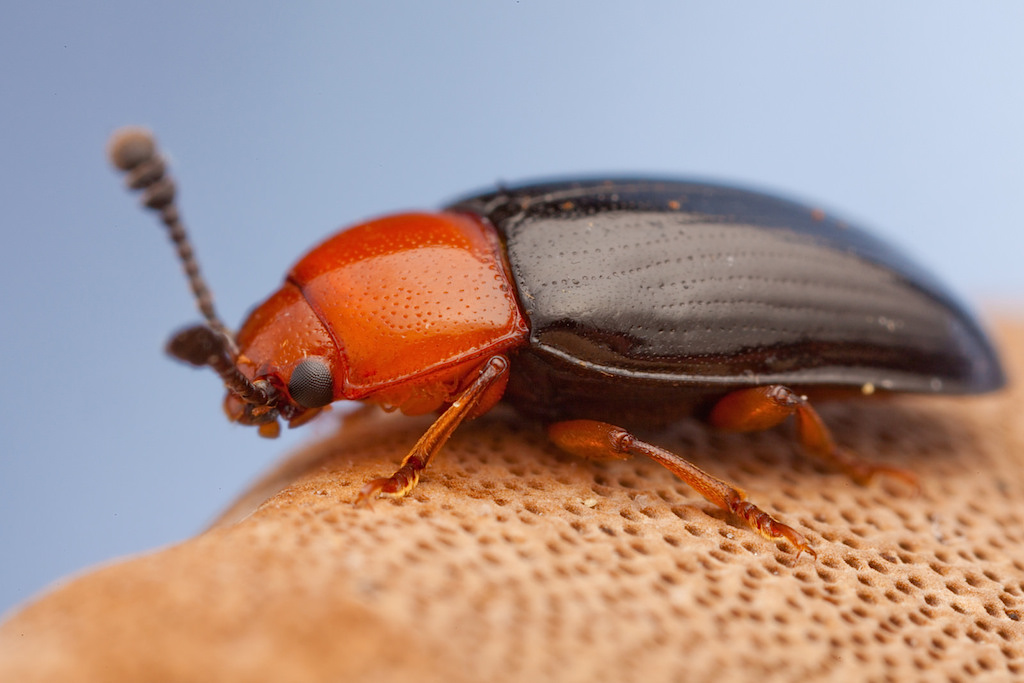
- Adult of type species Triplax russica

Scientific classification
- Kingdom: Animalia
- Phylum: Arthropoda
- Clade: Pancrustacea
- Class: Insecta
- Order: Coleoptera
- Suborder: Polyphaga
- Infraorder: Cucujiformia
- Family: Erotylidae
- Subfamily: Erotylinae
- Genus: Triplax; Herbst, 1793

Type species
- Silpha russica Linnaeus, 1758

Synonyms
- Ogcotriplax Heller, 1920; Paratritoma Gorham, 1888; Peudotriplax (lapsus); Platichna C.G.Thomson, 1863; Platychna (lapsus); Pseudotriplax Heller, 1920; Tritomapara Alvarenga, 1970; Tritomarapa (lapsus)

= Triplax =

Genus of beetles

Triplax is a large genus of small beetles in the pleasing fungus beetle family Erotylidae. They are found almost anywhere where fungi grow, but seem to be less common (though still widespread) in the tropics and absent from Australasia and the Pacific region. They are placed in subfamily Tritominae, or – in taxonomic arrangements that prefer a more comprehensive subfamily Erotylinae – in tribe Tritomini of the Erotylinae.

== Description ==
Adult Triplax beetles are smallish by pleasing fungus beetle standards, a quarter-inch (6-7 mm) long at most, with the smallest individuals of the smallest species less than one-tenth of an inch in length (2.3 mm). They are usually a bit more than half as wide (1.2 to 4 mm) as they are long, and have a rather flat back. Usually pill-shaped when seen from above, with head and wingtips evenly rounded and the sides almost parallel, some species have a more tapering shape, with slightly pointed wingtips and a blunter head. From the closely related genus Tritoma, Triplax can be distinguished by a flatter and more elongated body, with narrower elytra, and shortened lines on the prosternum which do not extend forward of the attachment points of the forelegs.

Triplax have the typical black-and-reddish colors found in many Erotylidae. Specifically, most Triplax have black elytra and a contrasting orange-yellow to reddish-blown pronotum and head. In some species, the head is also black, in others the entire pattern is reversed; some have reddish patches or bands across the elytra.

Head
The head is elongate-oval and well visible from above; it has small compound eyes with tiny ommatidia, indicating a diurnal or crepuscular lifestyle, but with overall rather little reliance on eyesight. Male Triplax adults possess file-like structures at the sides of the neck attachment, which, when the beetle wiggles its head, rub against the chitin and produce a squeaking sound; these structures are developed similarly to those of, e.g., Dacne pubescens, and in Triplax species with basally margined elytra they are also present in females. The epistome has a narrow broken margin around the tip. The "cheek" lobes below the compound eyes are well-developed, and very large in some species. The length of the 11-segmented antennae is usually more than half of the pronotal base width, with antenna segment 3 always shorter than the segments 4 and 5 together, and a "clubbed" antenna tip which is at least twice as long as it is wide and not very compact.

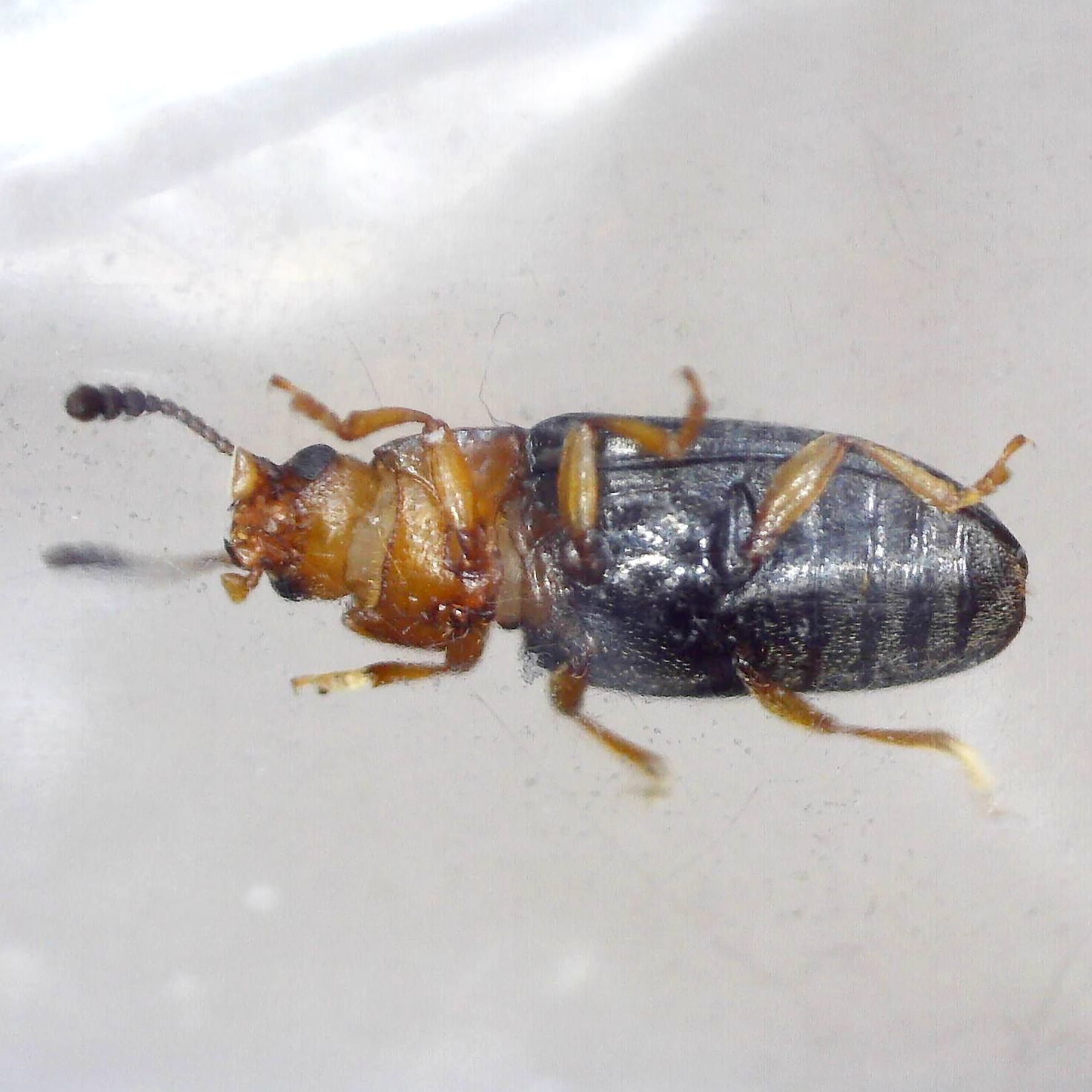
Triplax lacordairii from below; note the wide hatchet-shaped tip of the maxillary palps, and the absence of impressed lengthwise lines between the leg attachments

As for the mouthparts, the galea and lacinia of the maxilla resemble those of the related genera Ischyrus, Pseudischyrus and Tritoma, the galea being almost triangular, with a tip carrying sparse bristles at the outer side and a dense pack of bristles on the inner side. The lacinia is also covered in dense bristles, and – unlike in the similar genera – at the tip has two small black incurved teeth, set so closely together that they may appear as a single tooth. The maxillary palps are more or less strongly curved inwards and have a first segment that is at least as long as segments 2 and 3 together. Their end segment is somewhat triangular, abruptly cut-off, and at least almost twice as wide as it is long; in some species its length is only 20% of its width. Its cut-off tip carries a small brush, which usually is well visible, and consists of a single row of microscopic fleshy finger-like cylinders, which on their sides have many small bristles. In some species, this brush is reduced in size, usually hidden within a slit at the palp tip, and visible only at the sides. The labium has a mentum that is fairly narrow and strongly varies from being very much reduced and triangular to being well-developed and pentagonal between species; however, even between the individuals of a Triplax species, size and shape of the mentum are somewhat variable. The labial palps end in a more or less widened hatchet-shaped segment, which is sparsely covered in short bristles, with a longer strong bristle at the outer side. At its tip, it has a tiny brush, much smaller than that at the end of the maxillary palps, and composed of a single row of short smooth nubs.

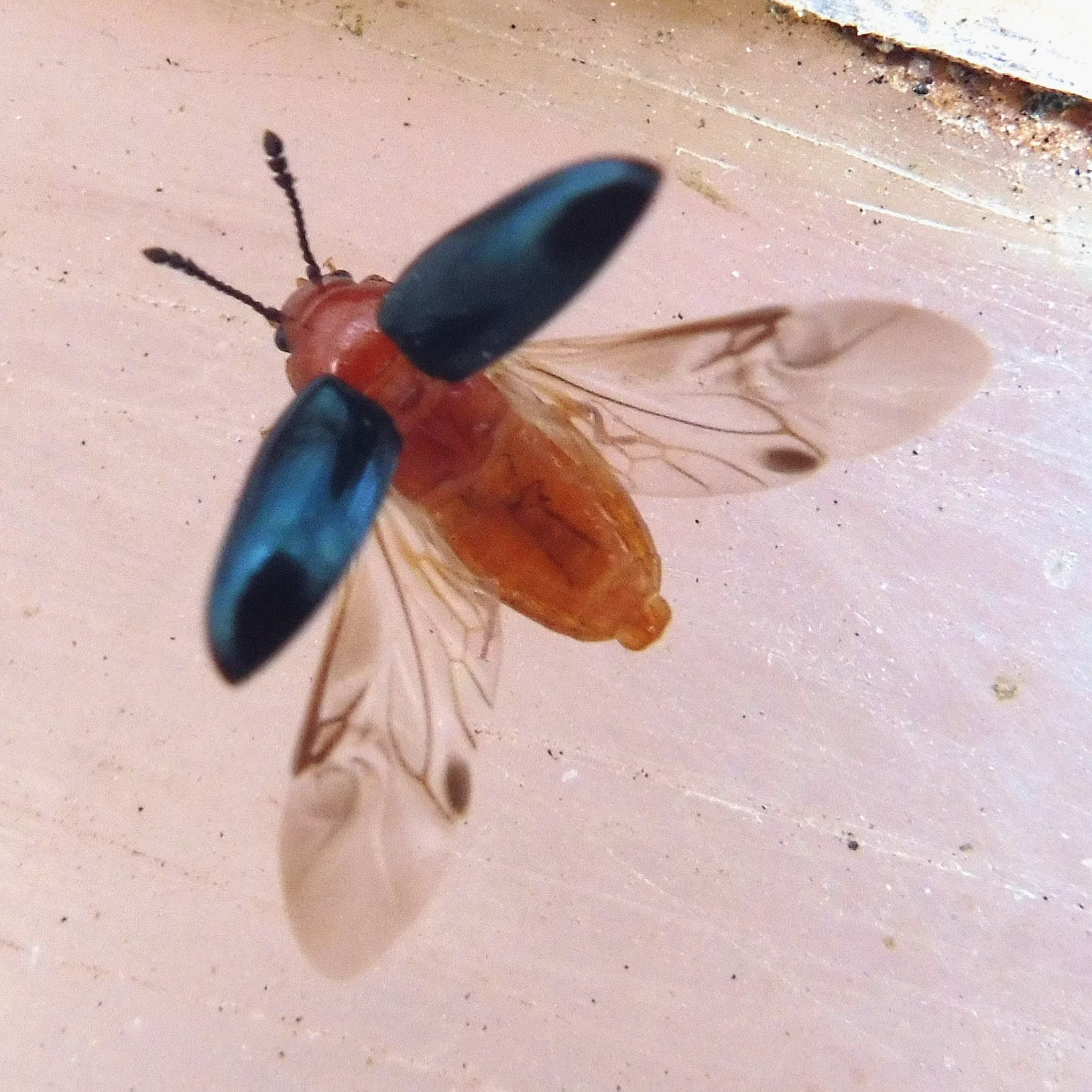
Triplax aenea with opened wings

Body, wings and legs
The prothorax is almost as wide at the base as the wings at their widest point and narrower at the front, giving it a trapezoidal shape. The pronotum is fairly wide and usually trapezoid-shaped, with the rear edge around half to three-quarters again as long as the forward edge, but it may be almost rectangular. A thin margin runs around the sides and rear of the pronotum, but is absent from the front between the compound eyes. In each corner of the pronotum, there is a sizeable navel-shaped pore, which may attain a conspicuously large size in some species. The prosternum may have lengthwise lines at the center margin of the leg attachments extending to the rear edge of the prosternum, but at most a tiny bit forward; more usually though, these lines are very weakly impressed or entirely missing. On the metasternum, the lines between the leg attachments are likewise absent or vestigial. The sclerites of prosternum, pronotal epipleura, mesosternum, metepisternum and metepimeres are all distinct. The abdomen consists of 5 sternites, with the first being the widest; at the abdominal base, lines between the hindleg attachments are usually present, with the tip of the abdomen protruding as a narrow bent process between the hindleg attachments.

The scutellum is bluntly pentagonal, in some species almost heart-shaped. The elytra are ornamented with regular lines of small punctuations, which may be impressed or t the same level as the rest of the elytral surface; they have a distinct margin at the base, except in those species whose females lack stridulation organs on the head. The attachments of each leg pair are set narrowly together; the fore- and mid-leg coxae are almost ball-shaped, while those of the hindlegs are wider than long. The trochanters of the hindlegs have a right triangle shape, and the femora are slightly thickened. The tibiae may be slightly widened towards the tip – depending on species, and often, but not reliably so, slightly wider in males –, and have a bluntly rounded upper/outer edge. On the 5-segmented tarsi, segment 4 is reduced, attached to the upper centerside of segment 3, and firmly joined to the base segment 5; segment 3 is straight or almost so on all sides.

== Distribution and ecology ==
Triplax beetles are almost found worldwide, except in the Australian region, but are most common in the temperate regions of the Northern Hemisphere. Almost half of the known diversity is found in Europe and west-central Asia, while just a dozen species is found in East and Southeast Asia. Roughly one-fourth of the described species occurs in Africa, and about one-fifth in the Americas (with 75% of these restricted to North America). Thus, the genus probably originated in the general Pontocaspian region.

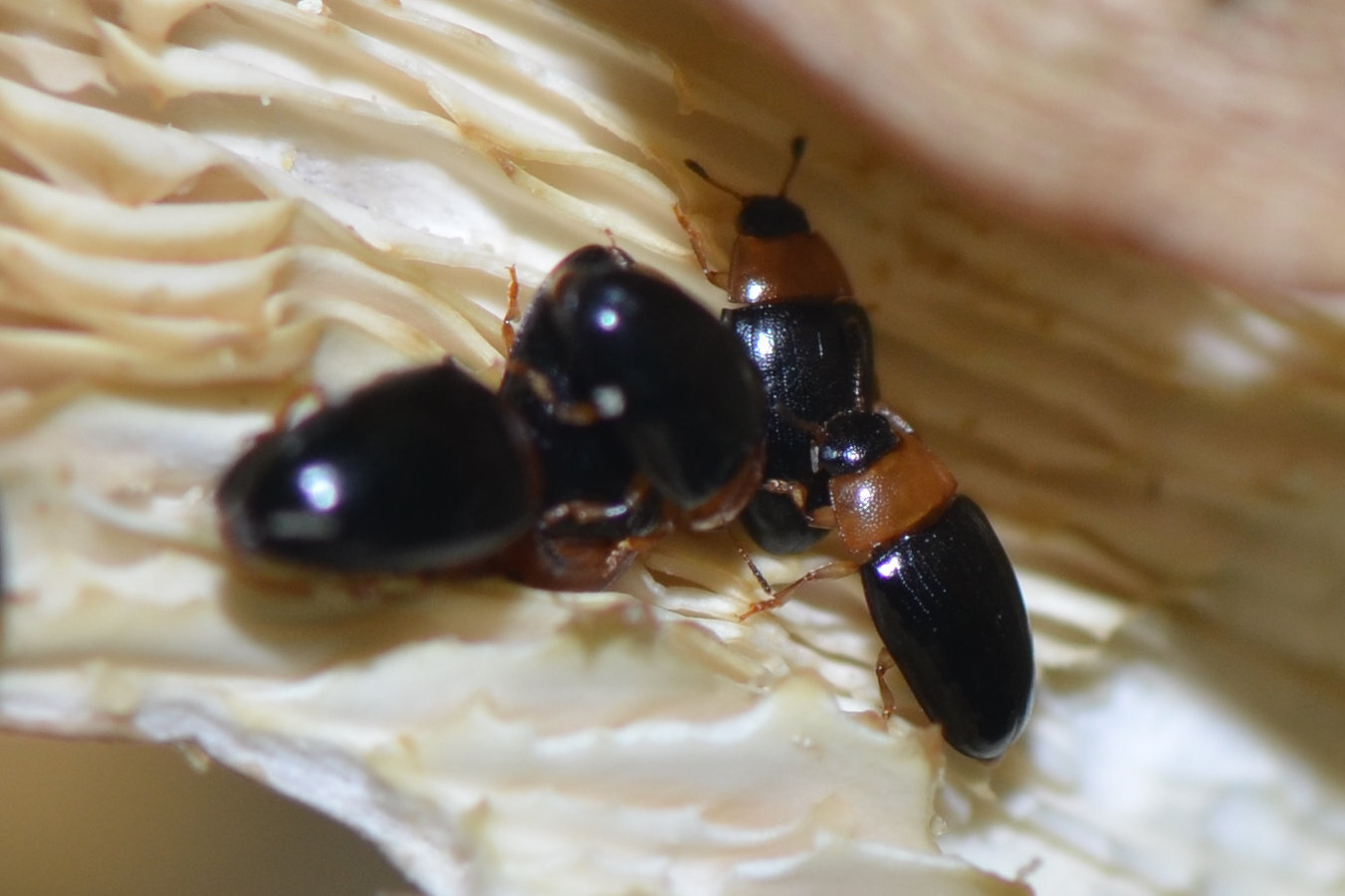
A group of Triplax collaris on a gilled fungus

They are woodland species, as usual for their family, and live near the shelf and tree-growing gilled fungi on which they feed. Their larval development is little-studied in detail, even though their larvae do not seem to be hard to observe, being regularly noted in passing in the literature. Active whenever the ground is not frozen, a particular preference for Pleurotus (Agaricales: Pleurotaceae) gilled and Inonotus (Hymenochaetales: Polyporaceae) shelf fungi was noted; at least in North America, most species of Triplax feed exclusively or nearly on one or the other of these fungus genera. While most pleasing fungus beetle species are not very social and tend to keep to their own kind, Triplax are noted for their gregarious habits – not rarely, dozens of adults can be found eating together on a single small mushroom. They also often occur in mixed-species groups; some, e.g. T. thoracica, habitually associate with several closely related species, suggesting some form of niche partitioning.

== Species ==
The following list includes species which 20th-century authors have usually separated in genera Paratritoma and Tritomapara, elevating Triplax to one of the larger erotylid genera, with about 100 species overall:

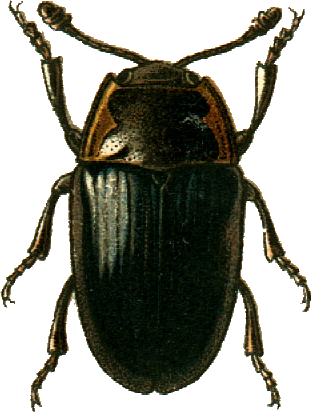
Triplax amoena

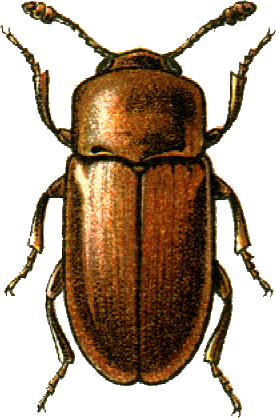
Triplax rubrica

- Triplax aenea (Schaller, 1783) (= T. bicolor Marsham, 1802)
- Triplax affinis (Lacordaire, 1842)
- Triplax ainonia Lewis, 1887
- Triplax akbesiana Escalera, 1925 (=T. escalerai, T. syriaca Escalera, 1925 nec Pic, 1908)
- Triplax alachuae Boyle, 1956
- Triplax alvarengai Johnson, 1967
- Triplax amoena Solsky, 1871
- Triplax analis Reitter, 1892
- Triplax andreinii Pic, 1930
- Triplax apicipennis Reitter, 1901
- Triplax atricaudata (Kuhnt, 1910)
- Triplax atripennis Iablokoff-Khnzorian, 1975
- Triplax atroguttata (Araki, 1943)
- Triplax bedeli Reitter, 1888
- Triplax bicolorata (Chûjô, 1941)
- Triplax brasiliensis (Guérin, 1946)
- Triplax breviscutata Fairmaire, 1868
- Triplax bruchi (Kuhnt, 1910)
- Triplax bussleri
- Triplax caduca (Gorham, 1888)
- Triplax californica LeConte, 1854 (= T. antica)
- Triplax canalicollis Lewis, 1887
- Triplax carpathica Reitter, 1890
- Triplax castanea Peyerimhoff, 1925
- Triplax caucasica Reitter, 1892
- Triplax collaris (Schaller, 1783) (= T. capistrata, T.sulphuricollis)
- Triplax contienensis Alekseev, 2014
- Triplax cuneata Boyle, 1954
- Triplax cyanescens Bedel, 1868 (= T. melanocephala Lacordaire, 1842, nec Latreille, 1804)
- Triplax cyanipennis Motschulsky, 1858
- Triplax devia Lewis, 1887
- Triplax dimidiata (Gorham, 1888)
- Triplax discicollis Lewis, 1887
- Triplax dissimulator (Crotch, 1873)
- Triplax divisa (Gorham, 1888)
- Triplax elongata Lacordaire, 1842
- Triplax elongatoides Mader, 1941
- Triplax emgei Reitter, 1885
- Triplax errans Boyle, 1956
- Triplax festiva Lacordaire, 1842 (= T. fasciata)
- Triplax flavicollis Lacordaire, 1842 (= T.championi, T.confinis, T.hogei, T.mesomelas)
- Triplax flaviventris Tôyama, 1986
- Triplax frontalis Horn, 1862 – black-fronted triplax (= T.occipitalis)
- Triplax frosti Casey, 1924
- Triplax fukudai (Chûjô, 1941)
- Triplax gracilenta Solsky, 1871 (= T. bicoloripes)
- Triplax horni (Chûjô, 1941)
- Triplax hurusyoi (Chûjô, 1941)
- Triplax japonica Crotch, 1873
- Triplax lacensis Boyle, 1954
- Triplax lacordairii Crotch, 1870 (= T. bicolor Stephens, 1830, nec Marsham, 1802, T. ragusae, T. ruficollis Lacordaire, 1842, nec Stephens, 1830, T. rufoapicalis)
- Triplax latipalpus Johnson, 1967
- Triplax lepida (Faldermann, 1837)
- Triplax lugubris Motschulsky, 1858
- Triplax macclurei Chûjô, 1963
- Triplax macra LeConte, 1854
- Triplax marcescens Boyle, 1954
- Triplax marseuli Bedel, 1868 (= T. discicollis Reitter, 1904, nec Lewis, 1887, T. reitteri)
- Triplax meghriensis Iablokoff-Khnzorian, 1978
- Triplax melanocephala (Latreille, 1804) (= T. collaris (Fabricius, 1801) nec Schaller, 1783, T. nigriceps, T. ruficollis Stephens, 1830)
- Triplax melanoderes (Kuhnt, 1910)
- Triplax menetriesi Faldermann, 1837
- Triplax mesosternalis Schaeffer, 1905 (= T.coloradana, T. monostigma)
- Triplax microgaster Boyle, 1954
- Triplax nagaoi Nakane, 1977
- Triplax nakanei (Chûjô, 1941)
- Triplax nigrina Reitter, 1879
- Triplax nigritarsis Reitter, 1898
- Triplax paganetti Obenberger, 1914
- Triplax peyerimhoffi Escalera, 1925
- Triplax pseuda Heller, 1920
- Triplax punctatipennis Heller, 1918 (1920)
- Triplax puncticeps Casey, 1916
- Triplax pygmaea Kraatz, 1872
- Triplax quadrimaculata Motschulsky, 1858
- Triplax quadrinotata (Araki, 1943)
- Triplax rediviva Gorham, 1888
- Triplax rubrica Reitter, 1891
- Triplax rudis Reitter, 1887
- Triplax rufipes (Fabricius, 1787) (= T. clavata, T. fusciventris, T. scutellata, T. swanetica)
- Triplax rufiventris Gebler, 1823 (= T. amurensis)
- Triplax russica (Linnaeus, 1758) (= T. castanea (Marsham, 1802), T. elongata Perris, 1873, nec Lacordaire, 1842, T. flavoscutellata, T. nigripennis, T. palliata, T. rubra)
- Triplax scutellaris Charpentier, 1825 (= T. bicolor Gyllenhal, 1808 nec Marsham, 1802, T. gyllenhalii)
- Triplax seminigra Reitter, 1879
- Triplax sibirica Crotch, 1876 (= T. connectens, T. gracilenta Reitter, 1879, nec Solsky, 1879)
- Triplax signaticollis Reitter, 1879 (= T. longior)
- Triplax sinica Chûjô, 1968
- Triplax sola Johnson, 1967
- Triplax subcylindrica Reitter, 1895 (= T. syriaca Pic, 1908)
- Triplax subtilissima Reitter, 1901
- Triplax sufflava Lewis, 1887
- Triplax takabayashii Nakane, 1966
- Triplax takashii Nakane, 1966
- Triplax tanigutii (Chûjô, 1940)
- Triplax tayabasi Heller, 1920
- Triplax tergestana Reitter, 1881
- Triplax thompsoni Boyle, 1962
- Triplax thoracica Say, 1825 – breast-plated triplax (= T. antennata, T. brevicollis, T. convergens, T. latiuscula, T. melanoptera, T. obliqua)
- Triplax tibialis Fairmaire, 1898
- Triplax trimaculata (Chûjô, 1941)
- Triplax triplacoides (Crotch, 1876)
- Triplax unifasciata Motschulsky, 1858
- Triplax vivida (Gorham, 1888)
- Triplax wehrlei Boyle, 1954
- Triplax yakushimana Nakane, 1959
- Triplax yatoi Nakane, 1956

"T." azureipennis and its close relative, invalidly named "T." bicolor by Guérin in 1952 but often included in azureipennis, as well as "T." maderi and "T." valdiviana lack some key traits of Triplax sensu stricto, namely the outsized navel-shaped pronotal pores and the maxillary palp tip brush. They have been moved to a new genus Xalpirta, which inhabits the Southern Cone and is suspected to be closer to Mycotretus and merely outwardly convergent to Triplax.

Some attempts have been made to divide Triplax into subgenera, but none have found widespread acceptance. It is generally agreed that some are probably valid, but their recognition is pending a thorough review of the genus:

- Subgenus Ogcotriplax Heller, 1920 – type species T.pseuda from Mount Kinabalu
- Subgenus Paratritoma Gorham, 1888 (= Tritomapara Alvarenga, 1970) – type species T.divisa from Central America
- Subgenus Platichna C.G.Thomson, 1863 – type species T.aenea from Eurasia
- Subgenus Pseudotriplax Heller, 1920 – type species T.tayabasi from Luzon and Mindanao
- Subgenus Triplax Herbst, 1793 – type species T.russica from Europe and adjacent regions

Triplax macra and Triplax thoracica have been proposed to form cryptic species complexes with their respective closest relatives. An Erotylidae COI phylogeny including 9 Triplax species failed to resolve any well-supported relationships between these however; instead, Triplax formed a paraphyletic and probably artefactual assemblage with the closely related Aporotritoma pulchra, Tritoma bipustulata and Ischyrus quadripunctatus, as well as the entire Erotylinae (or Erotylini if Triplax is included in Erotylidae) which resolved as sister to Aporotritima/Tritoma. The study did not aim at understanding relationships among Triplax, but to provide a framework of higher-level Erotylidae lineages; misrooting, long branch attraction or similar errors are likely to have confounded the phylogeny at the species level. Still, two or three putative lineages of Triplax emerged: One possible clade involving T.lacordairii, T.russica, and the (perhaps slightly more distant) T.aenea; these would represent subgenera Triplax and Platichna if they are valid. American species formed another group, with some Eurasian relatives (and I.quadripunctatus) mixed in between; this purported "clade" was extremely badly resolved. T.dissimulator was equivocally suggested to be close to the European T.rufipes; unexpectedly, T.frosti resolved as closer to the Eurasian T.scutellaris than to the highly similar T.thoracica, but with very low support in particular for the placement of T.thoracica. T.lepida, also European, apparently long-branch-attracted to I.quadripunctatus rather to another Triplax; it seems to stand somewhat apart from the T.thoracica complex, but may well be closer to these than to the putative Triplax-Platichna clade.

One or two groups of distinct South American species were at first included in subgenus Paratritoma, but its type species T.divisa was moved to subgenus Triplax. For the remaining species, a new subgenus Tritomapara was to be established, but this erroneously used the same type species as Paratritoma and thus was never valid. The species, probably at least a distinct subgenus or two, if not independent genera, are T.atricaudata, T.brasiliensis, T.bruchi, T.caduca, T.dimidiata, T.melanoderes, T.triplacoides and T.vivida. Of these, T.brasiliensis and T.melanoderes do not seem to be closely related to the others, and are most likely to be separated in a distinct genus.

To this group might also belong some unidentified beetles presumed to represent two or three species of Triplax. They were found in the George Crotch collection at the end of his Triplax (i.e. after the now-distinct Asian genus Rhodotritoma); two were from "Nova Gr." (Nueva Granada?) and despite both being labeled "purpuricollis" may represent different species, while another was from the city or the province of São Paulo.

In addition to the living species, a number of 30-35 million year old fossils have been assigned to Triplax; most were at first placed elsewhere:

- †Triplax contienensis Alekseev, 2014 (Rupelian)
- †Triplax diluviana (Wickham, 1914) (Priabonian)
- †Triplax materna (Wickham, 1912) (Priabonian)
- †Triplax petrefacta (Wickham, 1916) (Priabonian)
- †Triplax submersa (Wickham, 1912) (Priabonian)
