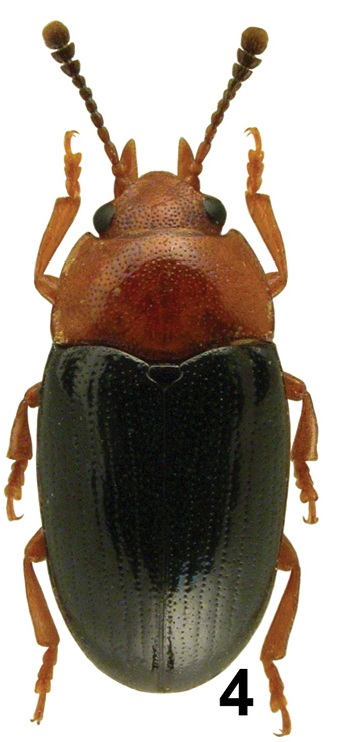

Scientific classification
- Kingdom: Animalia
- Phylum: Arthropoda
- Clade: Pancrustacea
- Class: Insecta
- Order: Coleoptera
- Suborder: Polyphaga
- Infraorder: Cucujiformia
- Family: Erotylidae
- Genus: Triplax
- Species: T. carpathica

Binomial name
- Triplax carpathica Reitter, 1890

Synonyms
- Tritoma carpathica (Reitter, 1890)

= Triplax carpathica =

Species of beetle

Triplax carpathica is a species of beetle of the Erotylidae family. This species is found in the Romanian Carpathians, the Bieszczady Mountains in Poland and eastern Slovakia.
