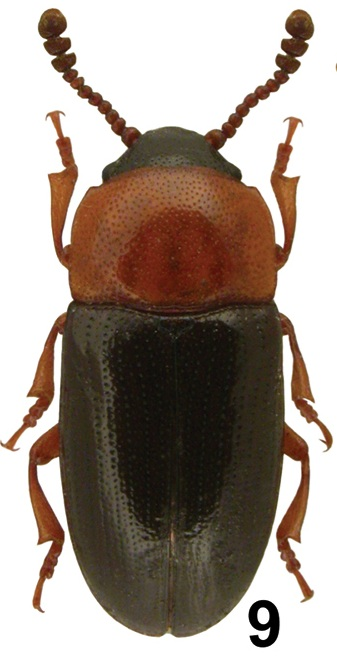

Scientific classification
- Kingdom: Animalia
- Phylum: Arthropoda
- Clade: Pancrustacea
- Class: Insecta
- Order: Coleoptera
- Suborder: Polyphaga
- Infraorder: Cucujiformia
- Family: Erotylidae
- Genus: Triplax
- Species: T. melanocephala

Binomial name
- Triplax melanocephala (Latreille, 1804)

Synonyms
- Triplax collaris (Fabricius, 1801) non Schaller, 1783: preoccupied Triplax nigriceps Lacordaire, 1842; Triplax ruficollis Stephens, 1830; Tritoma collare Fabricius, 1801, nec Schaller, 1783: preoccupied Tritoma collaris Fabricius, 1801, nec Schaller, 1783: preoccupied Tritoma melanocephala Latreille, 1804

= Triplax melanocephala =

Species of beetle

Triplax melanocephala is a species of beetle of the Erotylidae family. This species is found in Europe.
