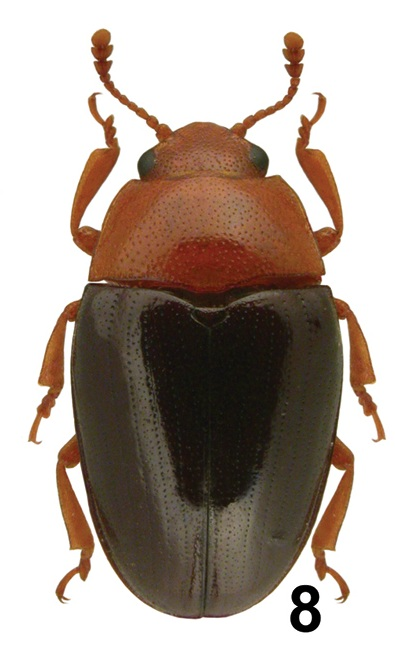

Scientific classification
- Kingdom: Animalia
- Phylum: Arthropoda
- Clade: Pancrustacea
- Class: Insecta
- Order: Coleoptera
- Suborder: Polyphaga
- Infraorder: Cucujiformia
- Family: Erotylidae
- Genus: Triplax
- Species: T. lepida

Binomial name
- Triplax lepida (Faldermann, 1837)

Synonyms
- Ischyrus lepidus Faldermann, 1837; Tritoma lepida (Faldermann, 1837)

= Triplax lepida =

Species of beetle

Triplax lepida is a species of beetle of the Erotylidae family. This species is found in Europe.

A color morph clarissima of a Triplax species was described by Roubal in 1937; it was initially assigned to T.lepida, but eventually identified as variant of T.scutellaris.
