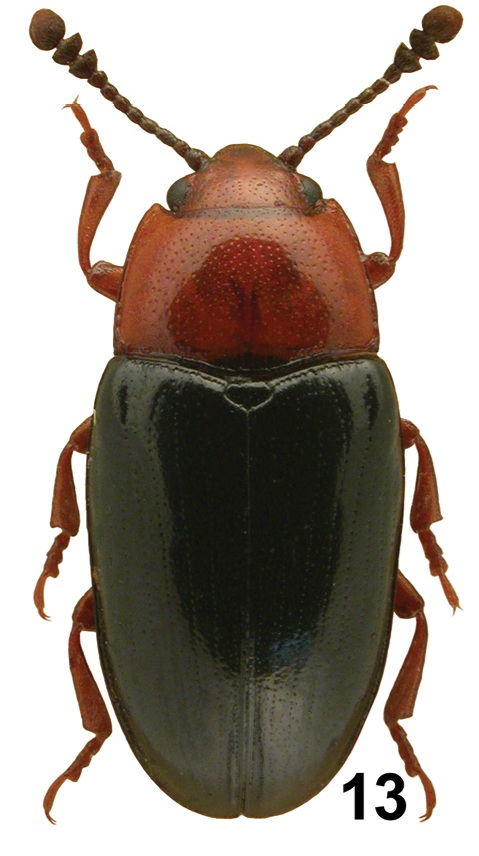

Scientific classification
- Kingdom: Animalia
- Phylum: Arthropoda
- Clade: Pancrustacea
- Class: Insecta
- Order: Coleoptera
- Suborder: Polyphaga
- Infraorder: Cucujiformia
- Family: Erotylidae
- Genus: Triplax
- Species: T. scutellaris

Binomial name
- Triplax scutellaris Charpentier, 1825

Synonyms
- Triplax bicolor Gyllenhal, 1808 nec Marsham, 1802: preoccupied Triplax gyllenhalii Crotch, 1870

= Triplax scutellaris =

Species of beetle

Triplax scutellaris is a species of beetle of the Erotylidae family. This species is found from Europe to Central Asia.

A color morph clarissima was described by Roubal in 1937; initially assigned to Triplax lepida, it was eventually identified as variant of T.scutellaris.
