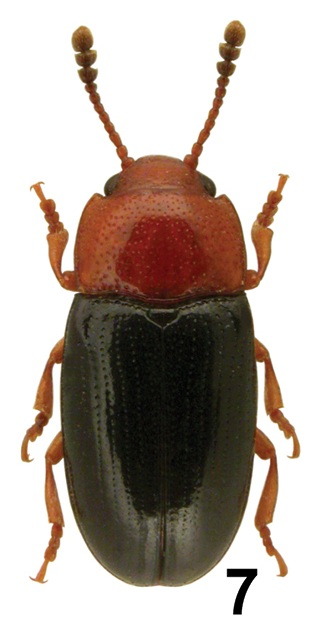

Scientific classification
- Kingdom: Animalia
- Phylum: Arthropoda
- Clade: Pancrustacea
- Class: Insecta
- Order: Coleoptera
- Suborder: Polyphaga
- Infraorder: Cucujiformia
- Family: Erotylidae
- Genus: Triplax
- Species: T. lacordairii

Binomial name
- Triplax lacordairii Crotch, 1870

Synonyms
- Triplax bicolor Stephens, 1830, nec Marsham, 1802: preoccupied Triplax lacordairei (lapsus); Triplax ragusae Reitter, 1892; Triplax rufoapicalis Kaszab & Székessy, 1953; Triplax ruficollis Lacordaire, 1842, nec Stephens, 1830: preoccupied Tritoma lacordairii (Crotch, 1870)

= Triplax lacordairii =

Species of beetle

Triplax lacordairii is a species of beetle of the Erotylidae family. This species is found in Europe and North Africa.

A variety ragusae was named by Reitter in 1892.
