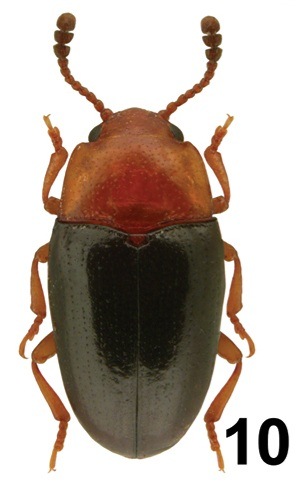

Scientific classification
- Kingdom: Animalia
- Phylum: Arthropoda
- Clade: Pancrustacea
- Class: Insecta
- Order: Coleoptera
- Suborder: Polyphaga
- Infraorder: Cucujiformia
- Family: Erotylidae
- Genus: Triplax
- Species: T. pygmaea

Binomial name
- Triplax pygmaea Kraatz, 1872

Synonyms
- Tritoma pygmaea (Kraatz, 1872)

= Triplax pygmaea =

Species of beetle

Triplax pygmaea is a species of beetle of the Erotylidae family. This species is found in eastern Europe.
