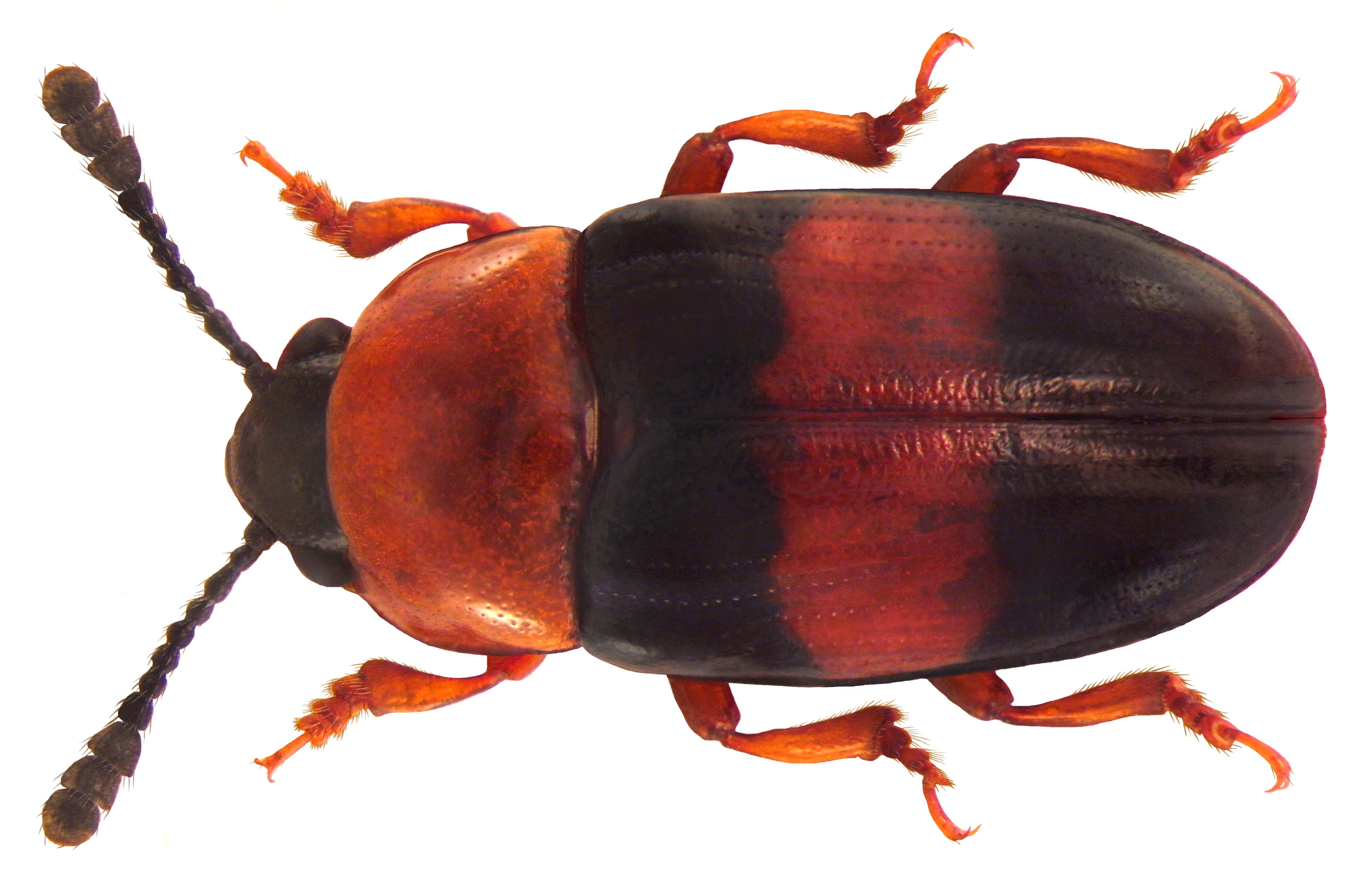
- Adult from Gainesville, Florida

Scientific classification
- Kingdom: Animalia
- Phylum: Arthropoda
- Clade: Pancrustacea
- Class: Insecta
- Order: Coleoptera
- Suborder: Polyphaga
- Infraorder: Cucujiformia
- Family: Erotylidae
- Genus: Triplax
- Species: T. festiva

Binomial name
- Triplax festiva Lacordaire, 1842

Synonyms
- Triplax fasciata Melsheimer, 1847

= Triplax festiva =

Species of beetle

Triplax festiva is a small North American species of pleasing fungus beetle (family Erotylidae). It is placed in subfamily Tritominae (formerly Triplacinae), or – in taxonomic arrangements that prefer a more comprehensive subfamily Erotylinae – in tribe Tritomini of the Erotylinae. It is one of the most easily recognizable pleasing fungus beetles of North America, the only local Erotylidae which is neatly cross-striped black and orange-red – hence its scientific name festiva, Latin for "colorful".

This species is suspected to belong to the Triplax macra cryptic species complex, which apart from T.macra and T.festiva also includes T.alachuae, T.frontalis and T.marcescens.

== Description ==
Adults of this beetle are roughly 4.4-6.5 mm long and 2-3 mm wide, with an elongated, almost parallel-sided and somewhat shiny body. The head and the antennae are black, with a brownish neck and (barely visible) antenna base, and yellowish palps. The elytra are black, with the second quarter from the base orange-red; this band is usually somewhat expanded along the midline, and in some specimens is generally wider, up to one-third of the total elytra length. Legs and body are also orange-red. As usual for the members of it species complex, it can be distinguished from less closely related Triplax by the dark antennae and a pronounced narrow margin to the forehead sides, which forms a roughly 90-degree angle to the tip.

Head
The head has small compound eyes with tiny ommatidia, indicating a diurnal or crepuscular lifestyle, but with overall rather little reliance on eyesight. All T.macra adults possess file-like structures at the sides of the neck attachment, which, when the beetle wiggles its head, rub against the chitin and produce a squeaking sound; these structures are developed similarly to those of, e.g., the unrelated pleasing fungus beetle Dacne pubescens, in being entirely covered by the pronotum. Seen from above, the sides of the forehead are notably concave between the antenna attachments. The epistome has narrow margins at the sides, which are formed by a continuation of the ocular stripes and set at an almost 90-degree angle to the unmargined concave front edge of the epistome. The "cheek" lobes below the compound eyes are well-developed and quite large; their sides extend a bit over the edges of the compound eyes. The antenna length is somewhat more than half of the pronotal base width, with the first two segments short and lighter in color, and segment 3 shorter than the segments 4 and 5 together. The "stalk" of the antennae is rather densely covered in long and coarse black bristles. The "club" at the tip of the antennae has an elongated shape, well twice as long as it is wide; it starts with the conspicuously widened segment 9 (but segment 8 already is somewhat wider at the tip), its middle (segment 10) is three times as wide as segment 7 and the base of segment 8.

As for the mouthparts, the galea and lacinia of the maxilla resemble those of the related genus Tritoma, the galea being almost triangular, with a tip carrying sparse bristles at the outer side and a dense pack of bristles on the inner side. The lacinia is also covered in dense bristles, and – unlike in Tritoma – at the tip has two small black incurved teeth, set so closely together that they may appear as a single tooth. The maxillary palps curve inwards and have a first segment as long as segments 2 and 3 together. Their end segment is somewhat triangular, several times as wide as it is long, and abruptly cut off at the tip, which carries a tiny brush that is usually hidden and only visible from the sides. It consists of a single row of microscopic fleshy finger-like cylinders, which on their sides have many small bristles. The labium has a rather narrow mentum, which is more or less angular, varying between individuals. The labial palps end in a widened hatchet-shaped segment, which is sparsely covered in short bristles, with a longer strong bristle at the outer side. At its tip, it has a tiny brush, much smaller than that at the end of the maxillary palps, and composed of a single row of short smooth nubs.

Body, wings and legs
The prothorax is almost as wide at the base as the wings at their widest point. The pronotum is wide by the genus's standards and almost rectangular, at the rear about one-third wider than on the front. A thin margin runs around the weakly curving sides and the rear of the pronotum, but is absent from the front between the compound eyes. The pronotum has a scattering of moderately-sized punctures, 1-3 times their diameter apart from each other. In each corner of the pronotum, there is a conspicuous navel-shaped pore. The prosternum has no obvious lengthwise lines from the center margin of the leg attachments to the rear. On the metasternum, the lines between the leg attachments are at best vestigial. On the base of the abdomen, lines between the hindleg attachments run along the tip of the abdomen, which protrudes as a narrow bent process between the hindleg attachments.

The scutellum is bluntly pentagonal, almost heart-shaped. The elytra have a distinct margin at the base; they are ornamented with regular lines of small punctuations, but compared to many relatives these are faint, the space in between the punctures slightly depressed. The attachments of each leg pair are set narrowly together. The tibiae are rather stout and somewhat widened towards the tip (often slightly wider in males, but not reliably so), and have a bluntly rounded upper/outer edge. Segment 4 of the tarsi is reduced, attached to the upper centerside of segment 3, and firmly joined to the base segment 5.

The aedeagus of the male genitalia has very narrow and strongly sclerotized dorsal and lateral struts of the tegmen. The lateral lobes attach under the tip of the basal piece; they are not constricted at the base and have a few bristles at the tip. The lateral struts forward of the basal piece abruptly expand into conspicuously wide arms which are slightly fused at the front and membranous at the underside. The median lobe is strongly curved and compressed, with a tipwards membrane at the back surrounding a hole in the center. It is uniformly narrow, the underside not bulging near the abruptly cut-off tip. The internal sac has a small muscle attachment at the front end, and emerges from the median lobe's hole for about half the length of the median strut; towards its tip has sclerotized patches at its back above the ejaculatory duct. However, these are very weak, narrow and irregular, hard to make out without staining. The ejaculatory duct is flattened and strongly sclerotized, almost straight, and sticks to the underside of the internal sac, but not very firmly. Its gradually tapering tip reaches roughly to the hole of the median lobe. The female genitalia are fairly generic, resembling those of other Erotylidae such as Megalodacne, which within the pleasing fungus beetle family is not particularly closely related to Triplax. However, the basal segments of the valvifers and the paraprocts are comparatively longer.

== Distribution and ecology ==
The type locality was not given more precisely than "North America". T.festiva occus in the eastern and southern USA and southeastern Canada, from Quebec, Ontario, upstate New York and Massachusetts to Illinois, Missouri, Oklahoma and Texas; conceivably it might range into Kansas up to the 100th meridian west, but the absence of records due west of the Great Lakes region (Wisconsin, Minnesota) seems to be genuine. Altogether, its range limits are not well known; in New York it occurs at least north to Onondaga County and Buffalo, and while it might genuinely be absent from southern Florida it occurs at least to Crescent City and Gainesville. In Arkansas it might only be absent in the northwest if at all, and in Texas it ranges southwest at least to San Antonio.

Hardly anything is known about its ecology. Like most of its relatives, this beetle eats fungi as larva and adults, specializing on the "conk" genus genus Inonotus (Agaricomycetes: Hymenochaetales: Hymenochaetaceae) at least as larvae. Unusually for pleasing fungus beetles, T.festiva is regularly encountered all year round, and not just in the very south of its range; it is not known whether they are sometimes active even in winter, or whether they tend to choose winter quarters that are more easily located by collectors than those of related species. In Alabama it has been found on February 5 (Mount Vernon) and November 29 (Mobile), in Lucedale, Mississippi, on January 1 and November 28, on November 13 in Onondaga County, New York, and in Austin, Texas on a December 4. Even so, they are most commonly encountered between June and early September, similar to their relatives.
