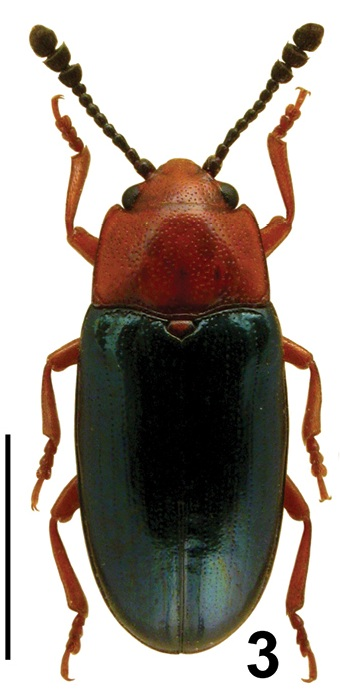

Scientific classification
- Kingdom: Animalia
- Phylum: Arthropoda
- Clade: Pancrustacea
- Class: Insecta
- Order: Coleoptera
- Suborder: Polyphaga
- Infraorder: Cucujiformia
- Family: Erotylidae
- Genus: Triplax
- Species: T. aenea

Binomial name
- Triplax aenea (Schaller, 1783)

Synonyms
- Cryptophagus aeneus (Schaller, 1783); Silpha aenea Schaller, 1783; Silpha bicolor Marsham, 1802; Triplax bicolor (Marsham, 1802); Tritoma aenea (Schaller, 1783)

= Triplax aenea =

Species of beetle

Triplax aenea is a species of beetle of the Erotylidae family. This species is found in Europe.

Adults reach a length of about 6 mm. The elytra are greenish, but head, pronotum and legs are orange.

== Triplax bicolor ==
A specimen of T. aenea dirtied by grease was described by Thomas Marsham in 1802 as a supposed new species Silpha bicolor, later placed in Triplax, and ultimately recognized as what it was and synonymized with T. aenea. However, the name "Triplax bicolor" has also erroneously been applied to some other members of the genus:

- Triplax bicolor as described by Guérin in 1952 is Xalpirta azureipennis
- Triplax bicolor as described by Stephens in 1830 is T. lacordairii
- Triplax bicolor as described by Gyllenhal in 1808 is T. scutellaris

In addition, the names Triplax bicolorata and T.bicoloripes (now T. gracilenta) may lead to confusion with the synonym of T. aenea.
