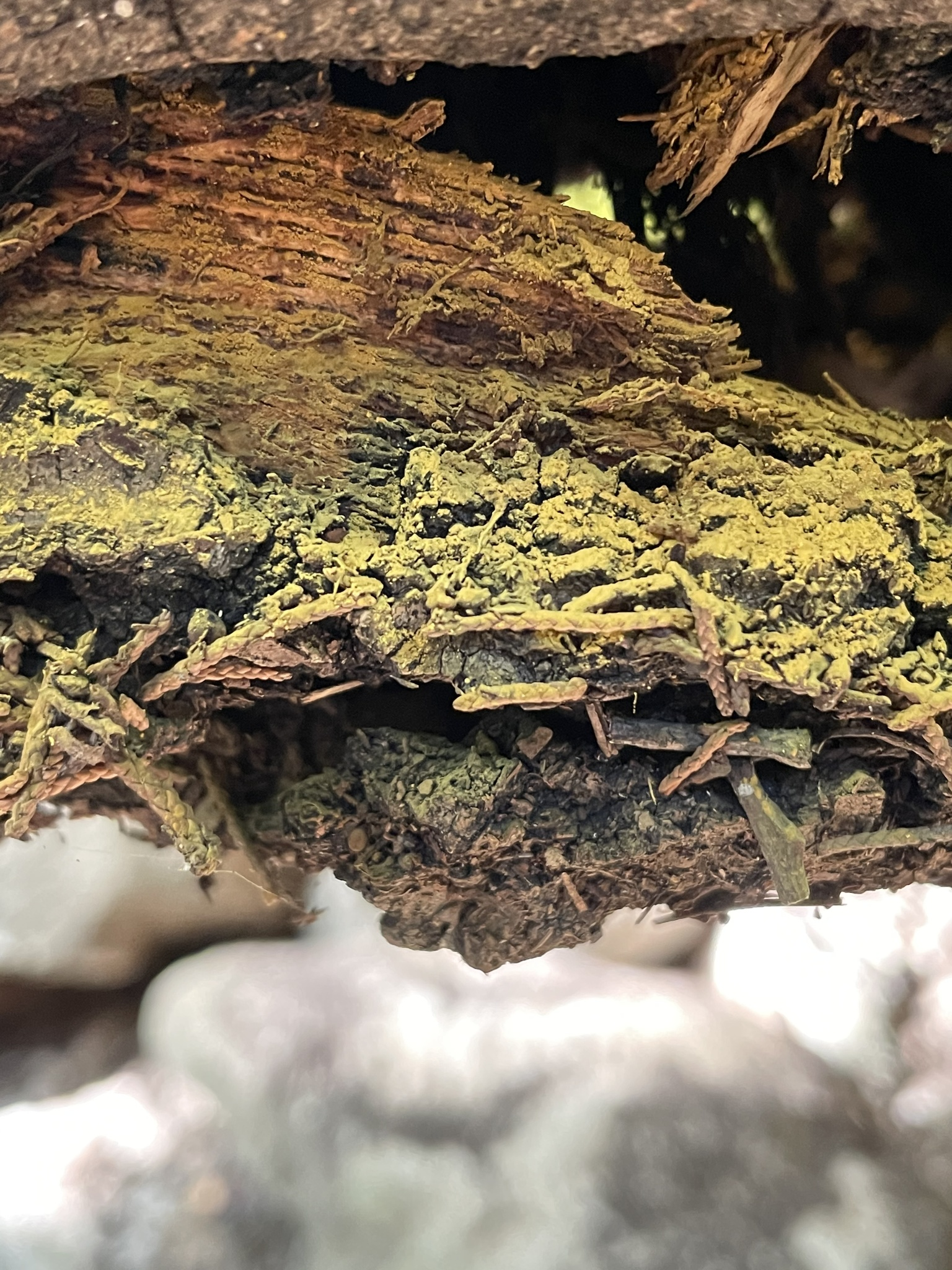

Scientific classification
- Kingdom: Fungi
- Division: Basidiomycota
- Class: Agaricomycetes
- Order: Hymenochaetales
- Family: Hymenochaetaceae
- Genus: Inonotus
- Species: I. andersonii

Binomial name
- Inonotus andersonii (Ellis & Everh.) Černý

Synonyms
- Poria andersonii

= Inonotus andersonii =

Species of fungus

Inonotus andersonii, also known as oak canker-rot and heart rot, is a species of resupinate polypore fungus that forms fruiting bodies underneath tree bark. I. andersonii induces canker rot in oak, hickory, cottonwood, and willow trees.

I. andersonii is "a true pathogen of living trees with a pronounced specificity for oak, [that] exhibits annual, widely effused fruitbodies, monomitic hyphal system, and broadly ellipsoid, yellowish, thick-walled basidiospores." Inonotus andersonii and similar canker rots are serious pathogens of California oaks and are associated with oak decline, failure, and mortality in many California oak woodlands.

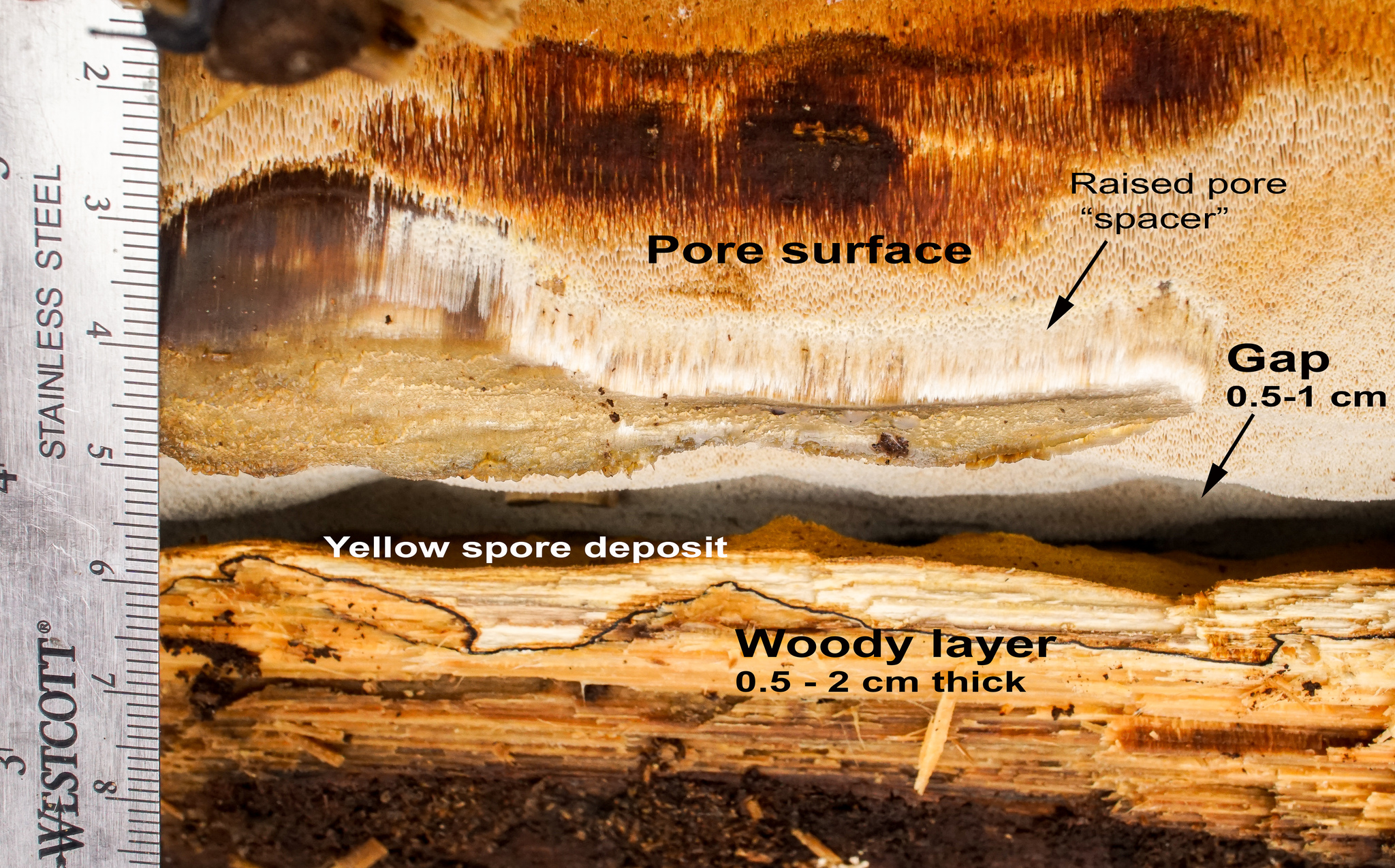
White oak log in Clarke County, Georgia, fully inoculated by Inonotus andersonii, infection attributes labeled by ecologist Bill Sheehan (iNaturalist)

Wood that has been infected by this species appears bleached of color and crumbles easily. Where sapwood decay reaches the cambium, the cambium may be killed, giving rise to an externally visible canker. The cankers caused by I. andersonii are commonly elongate and may become callused at the edges. The bark near expanding or developing cankers may also ooze varying amounts of dark sap. Affected branches or trees may show general symptoms of decline including poor growth, thinning, dieback, epicormic shoots (short twiggy branches arising from dormant buds on large-diameter stems) and branch or trunk failures. Generally, trees with canker rots decline slowly, often appearing to die from the top down as they slowly fall apart over a period of many years. The fruiting bodies (basidiocarps) of this fungus may appear on living trees or on recently failed stems.

This fungus has been recorded as a favorite food of the pleasing fungus beetle Triplax frontalis.

== See also ==
- Inonotus dryophilus
