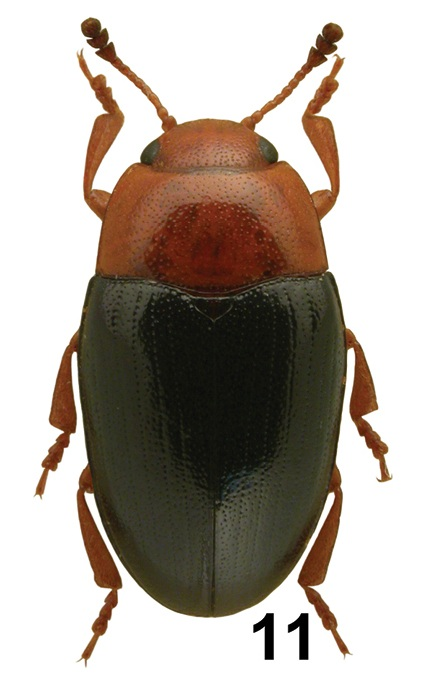

Scientific classification
- Kingdom: Animalia
- Phylum: Arthropoda
- Clade: Pancrustacea
- Class: Insecta
- Order: Coleoptera
- Suborder: Polyphaga
- Infraorder: Cucujiformia
- Family: Erotylidae
- Genus: Triplax
- Species: T. rufipes

Binomial name
- Triplax rufipes (Fabricius, 1787)

Synonyms
- Erotylus rufipes Fabricius, 1781; Platichna rufipes (Fabricius, 1781); Silpha rufipes (Fabricius, 1781); Triplax clavata Lacordaire, 1842; Triplax fusciventris Reitter, 1901; Triplax scutellata Trella, 1930; Triplax swanetica Reitter, 1892; Tritoma rufipes (Fabricius, 1781)

= Triplax rufipes =

Species of beetle

Triplax rufipes is a species of beetle of the Erotylidae family. This species is found in Europe.
