= Triplax frontalis =

Scientific classification
- Kingdom: Animalia
- Phylum: Arthropoda
- Clade: Pancrustacea
- Class: Insecta
- Order: Coleoptera
- Suborder: Polyphaga
- Infraorder: Cucujiformia
- Family: Erotylidae
- Genus: Triplax
- Species: T. frontalis

Binomial name
- Triplax frontalis Horn, 1862

Synonyms
- Triplax occipitalis Casey, 1916

Species of beetle

Triplax frontalis, the black-fronted triplax or black-headed pleasing fungus beetle, is a North American species of small pleasing fungus beetle (family Erotylidae). Probably endemic to the USA, it is placed in subfamily Tritominae (formerly Triplacinae), or – in taxonomic arrangements that prefer a more comprehensive subfamily Erotylinae – in tribe Tritomini of the Erotylinae.

This species is suspected to belong to the Triplax macra cryptic species complex, which apart from T.macra and T.frontalis also includes T.alachuae, T.festiva and T.marcescens.

== Description ==
Adults of this beetle are about 3.9-6.3 mm long and 1.7-2.6 mm wide, with somewhat shiny, elongated and almost parallel-sided body. They are mostly orange, with contrasting black elytra; the antennae are also black, as is the top of the head between the compound eyes and on the "cheeks". The scutellum is dark red.

T.frontalis can be distinguished from less closely related Triplax (such as the T.thoracica species complex, which it resembles in general appearance) by the dark antennae and a pronounced narrow margin to the forehead sides, which forms a roughly 90-degree angle to the tip. These traits, however, are not sufficient to tell it apart from other members of its species complex; these can only be reliably distinguished by anatomic details of their male genitalia.

Head
The head has small compound eyes with tiny ommatidia, indicating a diurnal or crepuscular lifestyle, but with overall rather little reliance on eyesight. All T.frontalis adults possess file-like structures at the sides of the neck attachment, which, when the beetle wiggles its head, rub against the chitin and produce a squeaking sound; these structures are developed similarly to those of, e.g., the unrelated pleasing fungus beetle Dacne pubescens, in being entirely covered by the pronotum. Seen from above, the sides of the forehead are notably concave between the antenna attachments. The epistome has narrow margins at the sides, which are formed by a continuation of the ocular stripes and set at an almost 90-degree angle to the unmargined concave front edge of the epistome.

The "cheek" lobes below the compound eyes are well-developed and quite large; their sides conspicuously overlap the margin of the compound eyes when seen from below. The antenna length is somewhat more than half of the pronotal base width, with the first two segments short and lighter in color, and segment 3 shorter than the segments 4 and 5 together. The "stalk" of the antennae is rather densely covered in long and coarse black bristles. The "club" at the tip of the antennae has an elongated shape, more than twice as long as it is wide; it starts with the moderately widened segment 9 (segment 8 bering barely widened at the tip), its middle (segment 10) is twice as wide as segment 7 and only maringally longer.

As for the mouthparts, the galea and lacinia of the maxilla resemble those of the related genus Tritoma, the galea being almost triangular, with a tip carrying sparse bristles at the outer side and a dense pack of bristles on the inner side. The lacinia is also covered in dense bristles, and – unlike in Tritoma – at the tip has two small black incurved teeth, set so closely together that they may appear as a single tooth. The maxillary palps curve inwards and have a first segment as long as segments 2 and 3 together. Their end segment is somewhat triangular, several times as wide as it is long, and abruptly cut off at the tip. Along the entire tip runs a well-developed small brush. It consists of a single row of microscopic fleshy finger-like cylinders, which on their sides have many small bristles. The labium has a rather narrow mentum, which is more or less angular, varying between individuals. The labial palps end in a widened hatchet-shaped segment, which is sparsely covered in short bristles, with a longer strong bristle at the outer side. At its tip, it has a tiny brush, much smaller than that at the end of the maxillary palps, and composed of a single row of short smooth nubs.

Body, wings and legs
The prothorax is almost as wide at the base as the wings at their widest point. The pronotum is wide by the genus's standards and almost rectangular, at the rear about one-third wider than on the front. A thin margin runs around the weakly curving sides and the rear of the pronotum, but is absent from the front between the compound eyes. The pronotum has moderately dense small punctures, 1-3 times their diameter apart from each other. In each corner of the pronotum, there is a conspicuous navel-shaped pore. The prosternum has no obvious lengthwise lines from the center margin of the leg attachments to the rear. On the metasternum, the lines between the leg attachments are at best vestigial. On the base of the abdomen, lines between the hindleg attachments run along the tip of the abdomen, which protrudes as a narrow bent process between the hindleg attachments.

The scutellum is bluntly pentagonal, almost heart-shaped. The elytra have a distinct margin at the base; they are ornamented with regular lines of punctuations sized like those on the pronotum, more sharly marked if anything, and separated by flat unornamented areas. The attachments of each leg pair are set narrowly together. The tibiae are rather stout and somewhat widened towards the tip (often slightly wider in males, but not reliably so), and have a bluntly rounded upper/outer edge. Segment 4 of the tarsi is reduced, attached to the upper centerside of segment 3, and firmly joined to the base segment 5.

The aedeagus of the male genitalia has very narrow and strongly sclerotized dorsal and lateral struts of the tegmen. The lateral lobes attach under the tip of the basal piece; they are constricted at the base, and have a few bristles at the tip. The lateral struts forward of the basal piece have wide arms which are slightly fused at the front and membranous at the underside. The median lobe is strongly curved and compressed, with a tipwards membrane at the back surrounding a hole in the center. Its tip and the internal sac are notably different from that of T.macra. The internal sac has a small muscle attachment at the front end, and emerges from the median lobe's hole for more than the length of the median lobe. On the back, two lengthwise sclerotized stripes at its back run basal to the hole. However, these are weak and irregular, hard to make out without staining. The ejaculatory duct is curved at least in the forward third, sometimes also closer towards the base, adjacent to the median lobe's sclerotizations. The female genitalia are fairly generic, resembling those of other Erotylidae such as Megalodacne, which within the pleasing fungus beetle family is not particularly closely related to Triplax. However, the basal segments of the valvifers and the paraprocts are comparatively longer, and the styli are conspicuously narrowed (only about 75% as wide as in T.macra).

== Range and ecology ==
T.frontalis is apparently endemic to the USA, where it occurs eastwards from the south-center of the country. Despite its association with wood-infesting fungi, it is less of a forest-dweller like most of its relatives; it seems to be most abundant in the southern Great Plains region, the type specimen lectotype (ANSP Horn collection 3167) originating in Texas.

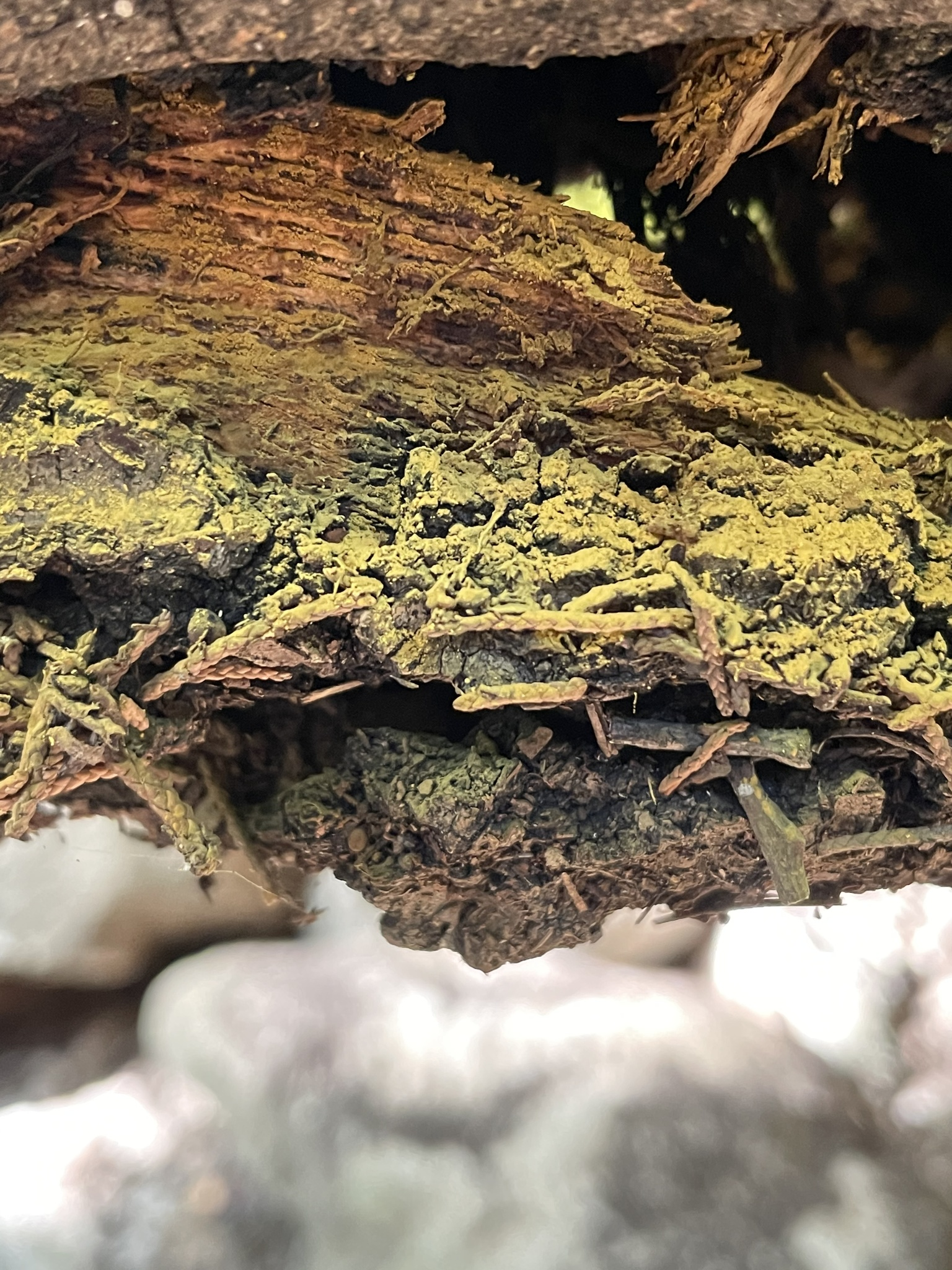
A favorite food of Triplax frontalis: Oak canker-rot fungus (New Braunfels, Texas)

Its northern limit is New Jersey and Pennsylvania, and it ranges south to Georgia and northwestern Florida. Westwards, it can be found from Nebraska and Iowa in the north to eastern Texas in the south. Some less certain records exist from the northwestern Great Lakes region far to the north of its main rage, e.g. Ontario in Canada and Minnesota, but specimen records exist from the southwestern Great Lakes region (Marquette, Michigan, and an unspecified location in Pennsylvania). Verified records near the Atlantic coast are e.g. from Dallas and Zebulon (both in Georgia), Great Falls, Virginia and Edgewood, Maryland; in the west it ranges at least to Sioux County, Nebraska (near the border of Wyoming and South Dakota), the Wichita Mountains Wildlife Refuge in Oklahoma, and Austin, Texas. Adults are active whenever temperatures are above freezing; in Oklahoma for example, they have been encountered as early as March and as late as December. But like their relatives, they are most commonly seen between June and August.

This beetle eats fungi as larva and adults, apparently specializing in members of the "conk" genus genus Inonotus (Agaricomycetes: Hymenochaetales: Hymenochaetaceae) such as the oak canker-rot I.andersonii which is a dangerous parasite of many commercially important tree species. Surprisingly for such a widespread and beneficial species, its larvae and pupae were undescribed until recent times.
