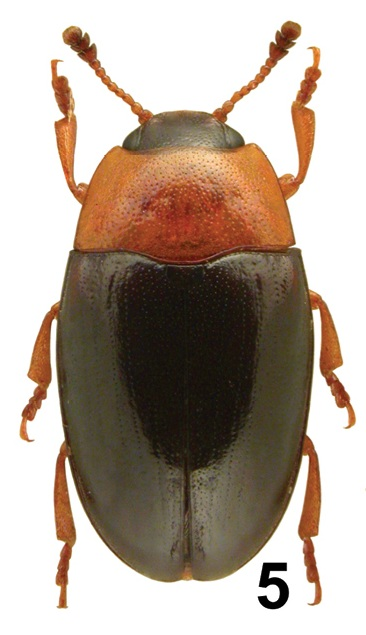

Scientific classification
- Kingdom: Animalia
- Phylum: Arthropoda
- Clade: Pancrustacea
- Class: Insecta
- Order: Coleoptera
- Suborder: Polyphaga
- Infraorder: Cucujiformia
- Family: Erotylidae
- Genus: Triplax
- Species: T. collaris

Binomial name
- Triplax collaris (Schaller, 1783)

Synonyms
- Silpha collaris Schaller, 1783; Triplax capistrata Lacordaire, 1842; Triplax sulphuricollis Reitter, 1887; Tritoma collaris (Schaller, 1783)

= Triplax collaris =

Species of beetle

Triplax collaris is a species of beetle of the Erotylidae family. This species is found in Europe.

The variety sulphuricollis, named by Reitter in 1887, was sometimes treated as a subspecies or even full species. However, it seems to be a mere color morph with no formal taxonomical standing.
