= Pseudischyrus =

Scientific classification
- Kingdom: Animalia
- Phylum: Arthropoda
- Clade: Pancrustacea
- Class: Insecta
- Order: Coleoptera
- Suborder: Polyphaga
- Infraorder: Cucujiformia
- Family: Erotylidae
- Tribe: Tritomini
- Genus: Pseudischyrus; Casey, 1916

Type species
- Ischyrus nigrans Crotch, 1873

Genus of beetles

Pseudischyrus is a small genus of tiny pleasing fungus beetles (family Erotylidae), containing only three described species which are apparently endemic to the USA. Little-known, this genus might just barely range into extreme northeastern Mexico, but probably they do not even reach the lower Rio Grande.

Genus Pseudischyrus is placed in subfamily Tritominae, or – in taxonomic arrangements that prefer a more comprehensive subfamily Erotylinae – in tribe Tritomini of the Erotylinae. It is considered closely related to the highly diverse Tritoma, and may even be embedded therein, making it important for any attempt to review the internal relationships of Tritoma.

Species of Pseudischyrus can only be reliably distinguished by anatomical details – the shape of the prosternum, and some features of their genitalia &ndash'; and seem to form a cryptic species complex.

== Description ==
Pseudischyrus adults are small even by the standards of their family, one-quarter of an inch long and one-tenth of an inch wide at most, and usually a bit smaller, 3-5 mm long and 1.5-2.75 mm wide. At a casual glance, they seem halfway between their close relatives Ischyrus and Tritoma in shape, being an elongated oval when seen from above, slightly convex on top, and with a moderate sheen. In the details of their anatomy, they are altogether strikingly similar to Tritoma humeralis and its closest relatives within that genus, such as T.atriventris which also a similar range as Pseudischyrus, as well as to T.tenebrosa and the related species which have a similar uniform coloration. The main difference, however, are the very large compound eyes consisting of many huge ommatidia.

Beetles of this genus have a generally chestnut brown color; they are a light straw-brown when freshly emerged from the pupa, but soon darken to a mahogany to blackish-brown hue depending on species. The legs and antennae are slightly lighter, but this can only be clearly recognized in the darkest individuals.

Head
The head has strikingly large compound eyes, whose individual ommatidia are also outsized. The top of the head between the ocular striae, is narrowed between the eyes and widens to the front, and the epistome has a pronounced bulge just behind the tip. All Pseudischyrus adults possess well-developed file-like structures that, when the beetle wiggles its head, rub against the chitin and produce a squeaking sound; the degree of development of these structures varies but is generally unreliable for distinguishing males and females. The front margin of the clypeus has a thin bead-like rim. Their mouth parts are indistinguishable from those of Tritoma unicolor, with a mentum that is triangular and not conspicuously wider than high, and no teeth at the tip of the maxillary lacinia; the last segment of the maxillary palps is wide and sharply cut-off at the tip.

Body
The sides of the pronotum are slightly curved towards the forward end. The pronotal margin is continuous except for the center of the base. The prosternum has a narrow bell-shape, and at the inner edge of the coxae there are impressed lines which conspicuously curve together at the front. The metacoxal lines are shortened, but conspicuous.

Unlike in some other Erotylidae, males and females do not have conspicuously different external abdominal structures. The male genitalia, especially the aedeagus, resemble those of Tritoma biguttata, while the female genitalia of Pseudischyrus are more similar to those of T.humeralis, in particular the genital tube, whose valvifers lack ventral baculi.

Wings and legs
Members of this genus have a fully functional set of two pairs of wings, with the tough elytra covering the parchment-like foldable hindwings at rest. The elytra at their widest point are wider than the prothorax where it meets the elytra, and have regular rows of small punctuations.

The attachments of each leg pair are neither particularly close as in Triplax, nor conspicuously far away as in Tritoma. The tibiae widen conspicuously towards the tips, and segment 4 of the tarsi is reduced, and attached to the upper centerside of segment 3.

== Distribution and ecology ==
These beetles have this far only been found in the southern and central USA. Their western limit is probably near the 100th meridian west, a major biogeographic boundary. However, few actual records west of the 98th meridian west exist, and among more than a hundred specimens, none were found southwest of Blanco, Burnet and Goliad counties, and the San Antonio region, 120-150 miles (200-240 km) from the Mexican border. In the northeast, the genus has been recorded at Southern Pines in central North Carolina; to the west, records exist from eastern Kansas. Specimens have been collected at least between April and October, but most in July and August.

Despite being abundant and easily caught, almost nothing is known about the lifestyle of these beetles and their larvae. The unusual eyes suggest they are nocturnal animals with excellent low-light vision; like many of their relatives they can be attracted with lights at night. Some have been found hiding under the bark of dead oaks in Florida; presumably, like their relatives they are forest dwellers that eat fungi.

== Taxonomy and systematics ==
Three species are placed in genus Pseudischyrus:

- Pseudischyrus extricatus (Crotch, 1873)
- Pseudischyrus nigrans (Crotch, 1873) (= P.acuminatus)
- Pseudischyrus ventriloquax Boyle, 1956

The type species is P.nigrans, described as Ischyrus nigrans by George Crotch 1873. When Thomas Casey established the genus Pseudischyrus in 1916, he also assigned the Tritoma brunnea described in 1842 by Jean Lacordaire to it. Casey was mistaken, however, because Lacordaire, who emphasized finely faceted eyes as a key trait of his Tritoma, would not have placed a Pseudischyrus specimen into that genus. Rather, Lacordaire's T.brunnea, as understood by contemporary authors such as John LeConte, refers to T.angulata. Casey's "T.brunnea", meanwhile, is referable to P.extricatus, while his supposed new species P.acuminatus cannot be reliably distinguished from P.nigrans.

In 1917, Blatchley established Tritoma dissimilis, unaware of Casey's publication of Pseudischyrus in a little-read journal the previous year; the type specimen is a P.nigrans, but subsequent authors also labeled specimens of P.extricatus as "T.dissimilis". Casey himself, eight years after setting up Pseudischyrus, mistakenly re-described a number of specimens representing at least 2 species of this genus as "Tritoma pallens"; his type specimen was an adult of P.extricatus that had emerged from the pupa just shortly before getting caught, and thus still had a soft exoskeleton with a lighter yellowish color.
