= Tritoma biguttata =

Scientific classification
- Kingdom: Animalia
- Phylum: Arthropoda
- Clade: Pancrustacea
- Class: Insecta
- Order: Coleoptera
- Suborder: Polyphaga
- Infraorder: Cucujiformia
- Family: Erotylidae
- Genus: Tritoma
- Species: T. biguttata

Binomial name
- Tritoma biguttata (Say, 1825)

Synonyms
- Cyrtotriplax biguttata (Say, 1825); Tritoma affinis Lacordaire, 1842; Tritoma basalis Lacordaire, 1842; Tritoma biguttata carolinae Casey, 1916; Tritoma carolinae Casey, 1916; Tritoma caseyi Deelder, 1942; Tritoma nigripennis Casey, 1916, nec Motschulsky, 1858:preoccupied Tritoma pinorum Casey, 1924 and see text

Species of beetle

Tritoma biguttata, the two-spotted pleasing fungus beetle or two-spotted tritoma, is a North American species of small pleasing fungus beetle (family Erotylidae). It belongs to subfamily Tritominae, or – in taxonomic arrangements that prefer a more comprehensive subfamily Erotylinae – in tribe Tritomini of the Erotylinae.

== Description ==
This is a tiny beetle, about 2.7-4.4 mm long and 1.5-2.6 mm wide as adults, widely oval in shape with somewhat pointed wingtips, and a shiny surface of the exoskeleton. As typical for Tritoma sensu stricto, T.biguttata has a triangular mentum, as well as an epistome whose tip is sharply cut off, causing the line running parallel to the epistome margin to angle towards the antennae insertions.

Their coloration differs according to subspecies: Typical adults of the nominate T.b.biguttata are black on the top of the head, the upperside of the pronotum and the underside of the pronotal epipleura, the scutellum, and most of the elytra. The "clubs" of the antennae are dark reddish-brown. The rest of head and underside, the legs, and the "stalk" of the antennae are orange. On each elytron, there is a large and somewhat triangular orange-red spot, extending at the front from next to the scutellum to the "shoulder"; to the rear, the spot stretches for 25-50% of the elytral length, narrowing towards the end. They are often mistaken for T.humeralis, but in those the underside is black; also, the wing spots of typical T.humeralis are farther apart and less triangular in shape than in typical T.b.biguttata, but there is much individual variation.

The subspecies T.b.affinis, however, has the elytra entirely black; it is otherwise orange-red all over, except for the dark reddish-brown antenna "clubs" and the dark orange to blackish-brown scutellum. Its coloration is unusual for a Tritoma and instead identical to many species of the related genus Triplax, from which it can be distinguished by the overall rounder and less flattened shape, and lines on the prosternum which curve beyond the foreleg attachments towards the center of the forward edge of the prosternum; in Triplax, these lines only extend from the posterior edge of the prosternum to the foreleg attachments. Even more than Triplax, T.b.affinis resembles the closely related T.atriventris, which differs in having a blackish underside and slimmer tibiae of the hindlegs. T.angulata is also somewhat similar, but altogether dar, and apart from a black underside it also has prominently expanded tibia tips.

Intergrade individuals (T.b."carolinae") have smaller wing-spots than the nominate – extending for at most one-third the wing length, but very small and dusky in some individuals –, as well as an orange to light brown pronotum which tends to be somewhat darker than in affinis.

Head
The head has small compound eyes have tiny ommatidia, indicating a diurnal or crepuscular lifestyle, but with overall rather little reliance on eyesight. Its surface has scattered small and somewhat indistinct punctures. Adults possess file-like structures at the sides of the neck attachment, which, when the beetle wiggles its head, rub against the chitin and produce a squeaking sound; the degree of development of these structures is unreliable for distinguishing males and females. The epistome has a narrow but unbroken angled margin around the straight tip; a transverse stripe separates the margin from the bulk of the epistome. The "cheek" lobes below the compound eyes are vestigial, do not reach to the lower edge of the eyes, and are hidden by the ends of the maxillary palps. The antenna length is less than half of the pronotal base width, with antenna segment 3 almost as long as the segments 4 and 5 together, and a "clubbed" antenna tip which is about half again as long as it is wide and ends with a small segment 11.

The galea and lacinia of the maxilla resemble those of the related genera Ischyrus and Pseudischyrus; those of Triplax are also similar except for having two small curved teeth at the tip of the lacinia. The maxillary palps have an end segment that is rounded, somewhat triangular, and a bit more than half as long as it is wide; it lacks a conspicuous brush at the tip. The labium has a mentum that is mid-sized and fairly narrowly triangular. The labial palps end in a narrow segment with a strong bristle at the outer side and a tiny brush at the tip, and the mouth-cavity sides are flattened lobes.

Body, wings and legs
The prothorax is almost as wide at the base as the wings at their widest point, and has the same characteristic pattern of scattered small and indistinct punctures as the head; towards the sides the punctures become a bit more plentiful and dense. The pronotum is fairly wide and trapezoid-shaped, with the rear edge more than half again as long as the forward edge. A thin margin runs around the sides and front of the pronotum, but is absent from the rear. In each corner of the pronotum, there is a small and inconspicuous pore, and near the rear edge there is a pair of weak impressions, in which the punctuations are larger. The prosternum is bell-shaped, with lengthwise lines at the center margin of the leg attachments extending to the forward edge of the prosternum and sharply curving towards each other in front of the leg attachments.

On the metasternum, the lines between the leg attachments are clearly engraved, and extend to about halfway between the rear edge of the leg attachment and the side of the metasternum. The scutellum is bluntly heart-shaped. The elytra are ornamented with regular lines of small punctuations; they also lack a distinct margin at the base, except for a very slim margin in front of the "shoulders".

The attachments of each leg pair are widely separated. The tibiae are somewhat widened towards the ends; their upper/outer edge is narrowed to a very thin "razor edge" towards the tip. The first three segments of the tarsi are increasingly widened; segment 4 of the tarsi is reduced, attached to the upper centerside of segment 3, and rigidly joined to segment 5.

On the abdomen, coxal lines are present, and the intercoxal process is wide and has a cut-off or slightly rounded tip. Males and females do not have conspicuously different external abdominal structures. The aedeagus of the male genitalia resembles Pseudischyrus. The tegminal arms are firmly joined at the forward end, form a tooth-like lobe on the upper sides just in front of the basal piece, and have a narrow and almost membranous section below. The median strut does not exceed the median lobe in length. The internal sac is short and entirely hidden within the sclerotized median lobe; its anterior end lacks conspicuous point-like muscle attachments. The ejaculatory duct does not continue into the internal sac. The female genitalia are conspicuously shortened, but all parts are present and functional. Only the proctigeral and vulvar lobes are close to the typical size in Erotylidae; at the eighth abdominal segment, the genital tube has short and weakly sclerotized lines. The seminal receptacle is small, rounded, and bears a short well-sclerotized arm.

== Range and subspecies ==
T.humeralis is found in eastern to central North America, from Quebec to Wisconsin in the north, and from Florida to Texas in the south. Its western limit is not well known; it ranges at least to Jefferson County, Nebraska and Goliad, Texas. In the northeastern USA, it occurs at least up to Durham, New Hampshire, Hamburg and Six Mile Creek in upstate New York, and to Middlesex County and Saugus, Massachusetts.

Two subspecies are accepted today. Highly distinct in coloration (see above), they represent a southeast-northwest divide:

- Tritoma biguttata affinis Lacordaire, 1842 – South Carolina to southwestern Illinois, southern Missouri, Nebraska and Iowa; in the south from Florida to Texas
- Tritoma biguttata biguttata (Say, 1825) – Quebec to Wisconsin, and northern Virginia to Michigan, northwestern Illinois, northern Tennessee, northern Missouri and South Dakota.

The type specimen of biguttata, like many beetles collected by Thomas Say, is probably lost. Its origin was given simply as "United States. Jean Lacordaire's type specimen of affinis has an even more nondescript origin: "North America".

There are also some questionable specimens with the color pattern of typical biguttata: one, at the AMNH, was supposedly collected by Charles Palm at St. George, Utah, far to the west of the species' known range; another one, in the F.C.Bowditch collection at the MCZ, has a label "Tex.", presumably meaning "Texas"; however, Bowditch once bought a lot of specimens from another collector, which eventually turned out to include many specimens with spurious or fraudulent locality data.

"Tritoma livida", named by Lacordaire in 1842, is an individual caught soon after emerging from the pupa; it was misidentified as a new species because it had not yet developed its mature coloration. Most likely, it belongs to T.biguttata affinis, but it might also be a T.angulata.

The two subspecies intergrade in a wide belt from North Carolina and southern Virginia via northern Georgia and central Tennessee to central Missouri and central Illinois. This hybrid population was originally described by Thomas Casey from a specimen (USNM 48800) collected by A.H.Manee at Southern Pines, North Carolina as a supposedly distinct restricted-range endemic species "Tritoma carolinae". But eventually such individuals were found all over the presumed southwestern end of the range of Tritoma biguttata, where it met affinis (at that time also believed to be a distinct species). In those populations, not just intermediate "carolinae" individuals, but the entire range of variation from "typical" affinis to "typical" biguttata can be found, and the three taxa were consequently united into a single species, with two subspecies connected by an intergrade population without taxonomic rank.

The southern extent of "typical" biguttata is at least to Heyworth, Illinois, Terre Haute, Indiana, Cadiz, Kentucky, St. Louis, Missouri, Buncombe County, North Carolina and Charlottesville, Virginia. "Typical" affinis individuals have been recorded at least as far north as the Oxon Run in Washington, D.C., Toccoa, Georgia, central Missouri, Raleigh, North Carolina, northeastern Tennessee, and Ocean View, Virginia. Some gene flow outside the main zone of intergradation is also evidenced by carolinae-type specimens collected in Washington, D.C., on the American Legion Memorial Bridge in Maryland, and in Jeannette, Pennsylvania. On the Oxon Run, affinis- and biguttata-type specimens were found together, while both affinis- and carolinae-type specimens were collected at Black Mountain, Southern Pines and Tryon (all in North Carolina), and in Virginia at Ocean View and in Creeds in the historical Princess Anne County. Populations including both biguttata- and carolinae-type specimens were found in Washington, D.C., at the American Legion Memorial Bridge, in Jeannette, and in Charlottesville, Falls Church and Lake Barcroft in Virginia. In one batch of specimens, taken on a June 3 at Asheville, North Carolina, individuals of all three phenotypes (and presumably also intergrades between them) are represented.

== Ecology ==
Adults of T.b.affinis at the southern limit of its range are active at least from April to November; further north, this warmth-loving species starts to hibernate in October. A record from woodland debris ("woods trash") on February 8, 1939, at [[Florence, South Carolina]], probably refers to hibernating individuals, but at Creeds, Virginia, on October 13, 1944, adults were still active on fungi. Wherever it occurs, T.biguttata is most often encountered in the hot summer months, when the adults can be attracted to UV light at night. The "carolinae" intergrades do not form a truly self-sustaining population; their offspring backcross with affinis and biguttata, while the F1 hybrids are constantly replenished. Thus, "carolinae" records are almost invariably in summer and early fall (June to September), when the new F1 offspring are on the wing and easily identified by their unequivocally intermediate color pattern.

Not infrequently, this species is found associated with T.humeralis – which looks almost like T.b.biguttata from above, but is easily recognized by its blackish underside – and somewhat less often with T.mimetica. These close relatives have somewhat more indiscriminate feeding habits, which probably prevents too intense competition.

Records not associated with fungi or woodland detritus such as tree bark are comparatively rare for Erotylidae in general. The affinis- and carolinae-type specimens from Tryon, North Carolina, were found on a mulberry (Morus) tree, and T.b.biguttata was found in a "cypress" stump in Prince Frederick, Maryland. While the beetles probably use the trees only as shelter, the specific trees they associate with can give an intication as to their actual fungal food source.

=== Food ===
This beetle, like its closest relatives, eats gilled fungi as larva and adults; its larvae, however, were not described in detail until 1988. Its main food source seems to be Amanita species (Agaricales: Amanitaceae), including some that are lethally poisonous to humans.

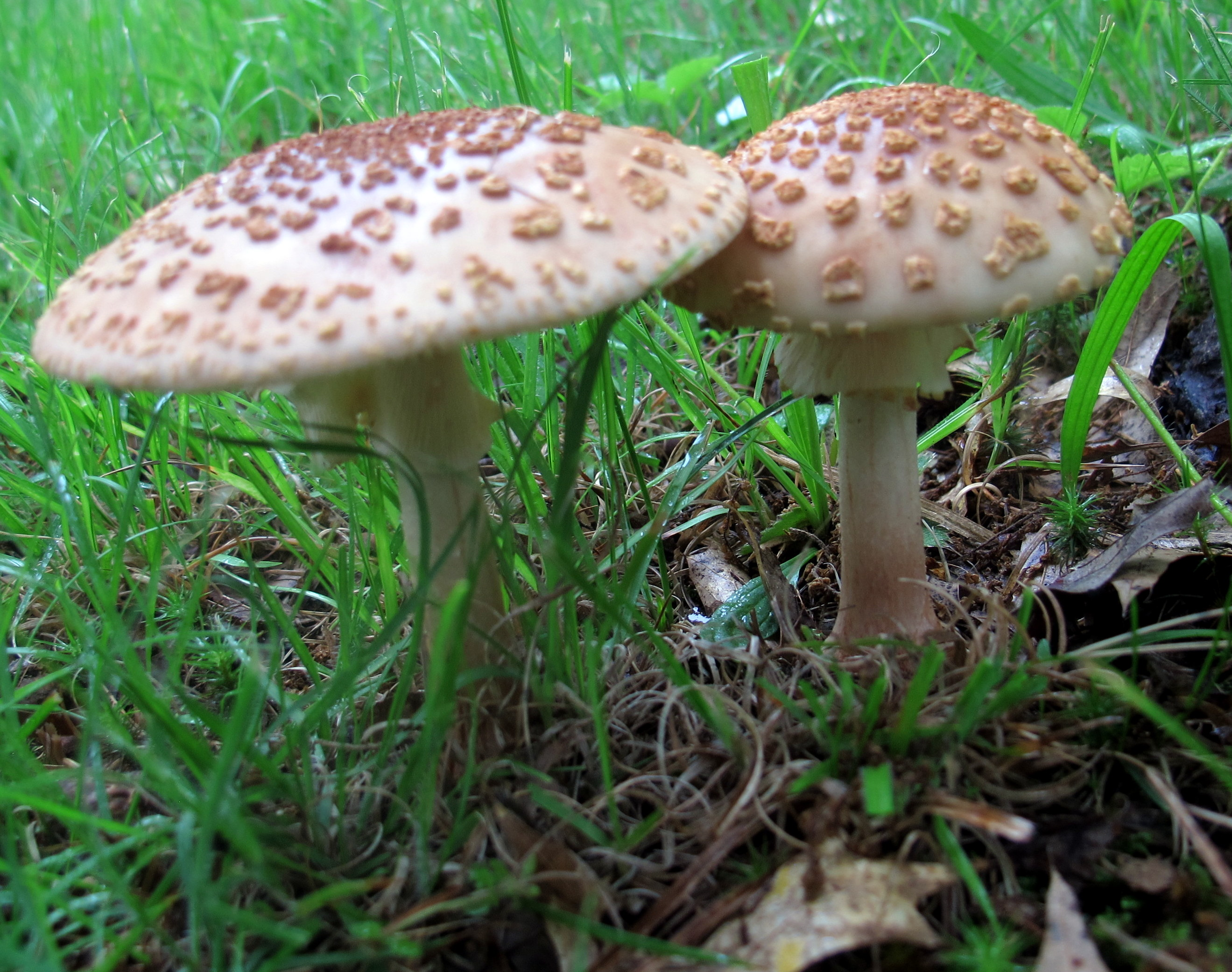
The favorite food of T.biguttata: Amanita amerirubescens (Thompson Park, East Liverpool, Ohio)

Specifically, the American species of blusher mushroom (A.amerirubescens and possibly A.novinupta) seem to be the most important food for T.biguttata adults and larvae, while A.excelsa is of secondary importance at least for T.b.affinis; larvae of that subspecies were once recorded to successfully mature feeding on an unspecified Boletaceae of the Agaricales order Boletales. Adults are less demanding in their feeding habits than larvae; primarily for T.b.affinis, the eastern destroying angel (A.bisporigera, listed as A.virosa in older sources), as well as the smooth parasol (Leucocoprinus leucothites) of family Agaricaceae have been recorded as supplementary food sources of adults, while the false death cap (A.citrina), grisette amanita (A.vaginata), and the honey mushroom Armillaria mellea (or a close relative) of family Physalacriaceae are primarily eaten by T.b.biguttata adults.

Apart from these main and supplementary food species, T.biguttata has been recorded on a range of other fungi. For T.b.affinis, these include the Amanita species Caesar's mushroom (A.caesarea, or possibly A.angelica, A.arkansana or A.jacksonii) and A.subsolitaria; an erroneous record for the European species A.verna probably refers to A.bisporigera. For T.b.biguttata, A.flavorubescens, the fly amanita A.muscaria, the death cap A.phalloides are listed, as well as "A.solitaria" and "A.strobiliformis"; the last two, however, are nowadays restricted to Eurasia, so their association with T.biguttata is erroneous. In the case of A.solitaria, the record might refer to Amanita abrupta or Amanita cokeri, while the American relative of A.strobiliformis is probably A.ravenelii. Non-Amanita fungi on which T.b.affinis was found include the gilled bolete Phylloporus rhodoxanthus of the Boletaceae, and possibly a Lepiota species of family Agaricaceae. For T.b.biguttata, a few records exist from an unspecified Agaricus (or a similar genus of Agaricaceae), an undeterminable species of the former "wastebasket genus" Collybia which united various unrelated Agaricales, the blancaccio Lactifluus piperatus (Russulales: Russulaceae), and the Polyporales greyling bracket (Postia tephroleuca, family Fomitopsidaceae) and Irpex lacteus (family Irpicaceae). The ringless honey mushroom Desarmillaria tabescens (formerly in Armillaria) of family Physalacriaceae, as well as some unspecified Russula (Russulaceae) have been found in association with both subspecies. None of those occasional records, however, necessarily imply that the beetles were actually feeding on those fungus species rather than simply sheltering there, or that the fungus in question was correctly identified.
