= Tritoma unicolor =

Scientific classification
- Kingdom: Animalia
- Phylum: Arthropoda
- Clade: Pancrustacea
- Class: Insecta
- Order: Coleoptera
- Suborder: Polyphaga
- Infraorder: Cucujiformia
- Family: Erotylidae
- Genus: Tritoma
- Species: T. unicolor

Binomial name
- Tritoma unicolor Say, 1826

Synonyms
- Tritoma unicolor Lacordaire, 1842, nec Say, 1826: preoccupied

Species of beetle

Tritoma unicolor is a North American species of small pleasing fungus beetle (family Erotylidae). It belongs to subfamily Tritominae, or – in taxonomic arrangements that prefer a more comprehensive subfamily Erotylinae – in tribe Tritomini of the Erotylinae.

== Description ==
T.unicolor is a tiny beetle, 3.3-5.6 mm long and 2-3.3 mm wide as adults, and widely oval in shape, with the wingtips almost as blunt as the head. As its scientific name implies, it is one of the most uniformly colored species of Tritoma, being shiny black almost all over, with even the legs a dingy brown – this easily distinguishes this species from the yellow-legged but otherwise similar-looking T.angulata, which also has more conspicuously widened tibia tips, whereas those of T.unicolor are closer to average proportions.

One unusual trait of T.unicolor is its pronotum, which has a sparse scattering of larger pits in the center, and smaller and denser punctures to the sides; this pattern is only visible in magnification, but can serve to distinguish T.unicolor from any melanistic individuals of other Tritoma species: T.angulata, for example, has strikingly uniform and equisdistant pronotal punctures, and in T.tenebrosa the pronotal punctures are smallest in the center and largest in two lengthwise stripes close to the pronotum sides. But these differences can be hard to see, and even noted Erotylidae expert George Crotch got fooled by the close similarity – one of the supposedly two T. unicolor in his collection actually was a T.tenebrosa. As typical for Tritoma sensu stricto, T.unicolor has a triangular mentum, as well as an epistome whose tip is sharply cut off, causing the line running parallel to the epistome margin to angle towards the antennae insertions. Also similar to T.unicolor is Pseudischyrus extricatus, which differs in the structure of the genitalia, and – visible with a powerful magnifying glass without harming the beetle – the huge ommatidia of its compound eyes, which are much smaller in T.unicolor. This difference is also relevant because it indicates that T.unicolor is diurnal or crepuscular, while P.extricatus is decidedly nocturnal.

Head
The head has small compound eyes have tiny ommatidia, indicating a diurnal or crepuscular lifestyle, but with overall rather little reliance on eyesight. Its surface is covered in densely and evenly spaced and clearly demarked punctures. Adults possess file-like structures at the sides of the neck attachment, which, when the beetle wiggles its head, rub against the chitin and produce a squeaking sound; the degree of development of these structures is unreliable for distinguishing males and females. The epistome has a narrow but unbroken angled margin around the straight tip; a transverse stripe separates the margin from the bulk of the epistome. The "cheek" lobes below the compound eyes are vestigial, do not reach to the lower edge of the eyes, and are hidden by the ends of the maxillary palps. The antenna length is less than half of the pronotal base width, with antenna segment 3 almost as long as the segments 4 and 5 together, and a "clubbed" antenna tip which is about half again as long as it is wide and ends with a small segment 11.

The mouthparts are virtually identical to those of Pseudischyrus. The galea and lacinia of the maxilla resemble those of the related genus Ischyrus; those of Triplax are also similar except for having two small curved teeth at the tip of the lacinia. The maxillary palps have an end segment that is rounded, somewhat triangular, and a bit more than half as long as it is wide; it lacks a conspicuous brush at the tip. The labium has a mentum that is mid-sized and fairly narrowly triangular. The labial palps end in a narrow segment with a strong bristle at the outer side and a tiny brush at the tip, and the mouth-cavity sides are flattened lobes.

Body, wings and legs
The prothorax is almost as wide at the base as the wings at their widest point. The pronotum is fairly wide and trapezoid-shaped, with the rear edge more than half again as long as the forward edge, and has the characteristic pattern of a few large punctures in the center and smaller and denser punctures at the sides, as described above. A thin margin runs around the sides and front of the pronotum, but is absent from the rear. In each corner of the pronotum, there is a small and inconspicuous pore. The prosternum is bell-shaped, with lengthwise lines at the center margin of the leg attachments extending to the forward edge of the prosternum and sharply curving towards each other in front of the leg attachments.

On the metasternum, the lines between the leg attachments are clearly engraved, and extend to about halfway between the rear edge of the leg attachment and the side of the metasternum. The scutellum is bluntly heart-shaped. The elytra are ornamented with regular lines of small punctuations; they also lack a distinct margin at the base, except for a very slim margin in front of the "shoulders".

The attachments of each leg pair are widely separated. The tibiae are somewhat widened towards the ends; their upper/outer edge is narrowed to a very thin "razor edge" towards the tip. The first three segments of the tarsi are increasingly widened; segment 4 of the tarsi is reduced, attached to the upper centerside of segment 3, and rigidly joined to segment 5.

On the abdomen, coxal lines are present, and the intercoxal process is wide and has a cut-off or slightly rounded tip. Males and females do not have conspicuously different external abdominal structures. The aedeagus of the male genitalia resembles Pseudischyrus. The tegminal arms are firmly joined at the forward end, form a tooth-like lobe on the upper sides just in front of the basal piece, and have a narrow and almost membranous section below. The median strut does not exceed the median lobe in length. The internal sac is short and entirely hidden within the sclerotized median lobe; its anterior end lacks conspicuous point-like muscle attachments. The ejaculatory duct does not continue into the internal sac. The female genitalia are conspicuously shortened, but all parts are present and functional. Only the proctigeral and vulvar lobes are close to the typical size in Erotylidae; at the eighth abdominal segment, the genital tube has short and weakly sclerotized lines. The seminal receptacle is small, rounded, and bears a short well-sclerotized arm.

== Range and ecology ==
T.unicolor is found in eastern North America. Its northern limit extends from Ontario in Canada (where it occurs at least up to Grimsby) and the New England states of the USA (at least north to Buffalo and Johnstown, New York, and Cromwell, Connecticut) to Minnesota. In the south, it ranges from Georgia to Louisiana and eastern Oklahoma; westwards, it occurs at least to Iowa City, Iowa and Topeka, Kansas. Unlike most North American Tritoma, this species seems to be absent from Florida, and might not range much more south than Valley Head, Alabama, and Atlanta, Georgia.

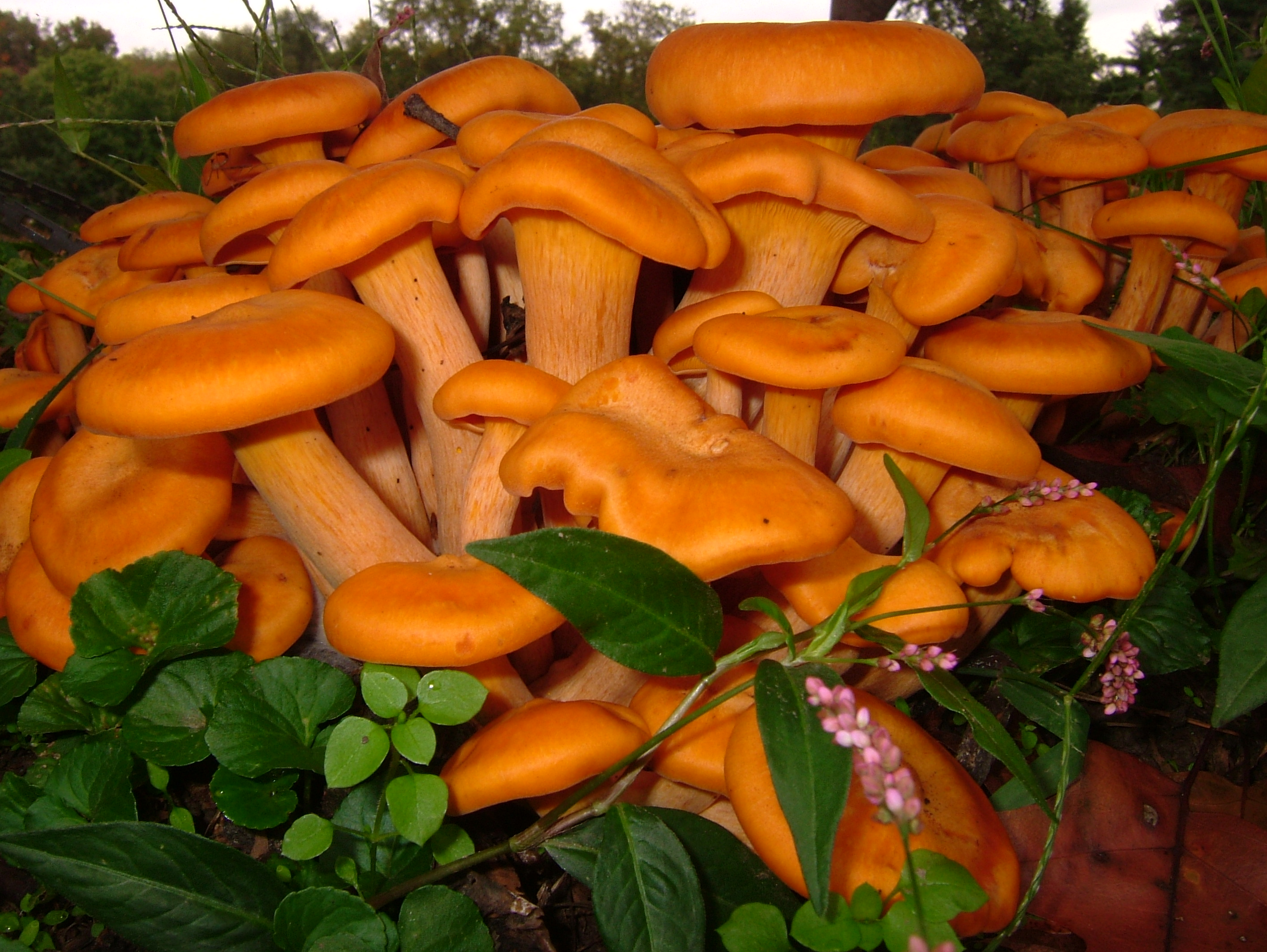
The favorite food of T.unicolor: Eastern jack-o'lantern mushrooms (Philadelphia, Pennsylvania)

The type specimen, like many beetles collected by Thomas Say, is probably lost. Jean Lacordaire re-established the species in 1842, using the same scientific name as Say but apparently ignorant of his earlier description. Lacordaire also included a "variety A" in 'his T.unicolor, but this is actually the related species T.angulata.

Adults are active during the warmer months, e.g. from early May to late October in Illinois and Indiana; unlike related species they seem to be most common at the end of summer, around August/September rather than around July. At the north of their range they are active at least to the end of September, and have been recorded in Detroit even in October. This beetle, as usual for Tritoma sensu stricto, preferably eats gilled fungi of order Agaricales as larva and adults. Specifically, the eastern jack-o'lantern mushroom Omphalotus illudens of family Omphalotaceae is recorded as favorite food of T.unicolor, which are entirely unharmed by the illudins that render these mushrooms poisonous to humans. Other records of this beetle species – probably only adults, whose food preferences are suspected to be less strict – are from the brain puffball Calvatia craniiformis (an unusual Agaricaceae), as well as unspecified Hypholoma (Strophariaceae) and an undeterminable mushroom probably of the suborder Tricholomatineae (the former "Tricholomataceae" assemblage).
