= Pseudischyrus extricatus =

Scientific classification
- Kingdom: Animalia
- Phylum: Arthropoda
- Clade: Pancrustacea
- Class: Insecta
- Order: Coleoptera
- Suborder: Polyphaga
- Infraorder: Cucujiformia
- Family: Erotylidae
- Genus: Pseudischyrus
- Species: P. extricatus

Binomial name
- Pseudischyrus extricatus (Crotch, 1873)

Synonyms
- Ischyrus extricatus Crotch, 1873; Tritoma pallens Casey, 1924

Species of beetle

Pseudischyrus extricatus is a tiny species of pleasing fungus beetle (family Erotylidae) endemic to the USA. Within its family, this beetle is placed in subfamily Tritominae, or – in taxonomic arrangements that prefer a more comprehensive subfamily Erotylinae – in tribe Tritomini of the Erotylinae.

This beetle looks highly similar to the closely related pleasing fungus beetle Tritoma angulata, whose range overlaps with that of P.extricatus. They differ in the structure of their genitalia, and – visible with a powerful magnifying glass without harming the beetle – the ommatidia of their compound eyes, which are comparatively huge in P.extricatus and much smaller in T.angulata. This difference is also relevant because it indicates that T.angulata is diurnal or crepuscular, while P.extricatus is decidedly nocturnal.

From its congeners, this species can only be distinguished by anatomical details, namely the exact shape of the prosternum, and some features of their genitalia.

== Description ==
Pseudischyrus extricatus adults are small even by the standards of their family, at most one-quarter of an inch long and one-tenth of an inch wide, and usually a bit smaller, 3-5 mm long and 1.6-2.75 mm wide. At a casual glance, they seem halfway between their close relatives Ischyrus and Tritoma in shape, being an elongated oval when seen from above, evenly rounded all around, and slightly convex on top. The body is widest just behind the "shoulders", the closed wings from that point rearwards having a parabola shape, and the carapace surface has a moderate sheen. In the details of their anatomy, they are altogether strikingly similar to Tritoma angulata and related species such as T.atriventris, T.humeralis and T.tenebrosa. The most obvious difference are the very large compound eyes of P.extricatus, which consist of many huge ommatidia.

They are a light reddish-brown all over when freshly emerged from the pupa, but soon darken to a blackish-brown hue. The legs and antennae are lighter, but so slightly that it is only obvious in fully mature individuals. Many individuals from the southwest of the species' range – Texas and Louisiana – and some from elsewhere have a dark chestnut brown pronotum and deeply black elytra. This resembles a darkened version of the orange-and-black bicoloration found in many pleasing fungus beetles – e.g. the closely related genus Triplax, which is easily distinguished from P.extricatus by a flat-backed shape.

Head
The head has strikingly large compound eyes, whose individual ommatidia are also outsized. The top of the head between the ocular striae, is narrowed between the eyes and widens to the front, and the epistome has a pronounced bulge just behind the tip. The head is densely covered in obscure punctures, which are usually separated from each other by less than their diameter. All P.extricatus adults possess well-developed file-like structures that, when the beetle wiggles its head, rub against the chitin and produce a squeaking sound; the degree of development of these structures varies but is generally unreliable for distinguishing males and females. The front margin of the clypeus has a thin bead-like rim. Its mouth parts are indistinguishable from those of Tritoma unicolor, with a mentum that is triangular and not conspicuously wider than high, and no teeth at the tip of the maxillary lacinia; the last segment of the maxillary palps is wide and sharply cut-off at the tip.

Body
The prothorax is short and wide, with curved sides of the pronotum. The pronotal margin is continuous except for the center of the base, and the pronotal surface is covered in indistinct punctures like those on the head, densely set on the sides and more loosely-strewn in the center. In the front half of the pronotum, behind the forward corners on each side, the larger dense punctures have many tiny pin-prick-like punctures strewn between them, forming a distinct patch of highly structured surface. The prosternum has a sharply compressed tip which looks like a jug's pouring-lip, and overall a narrow bell-shape whose proportions distinguish P.extricatus from its otherwise very similar congeners. At the inner edge of the coxae there are impressed lines which are widely separated at the rear and slightly curve together at the front. The metacoxal lines are shortened, but conspicuous.

P.extricatus males and females of do not have conspicuously different external abdominal structures. The male genitalia, especially the aedeagus, resemble those of Tritoma humeralis, with an internal sac that is not sclerotized itself, but enclosed within the sclerotized median lobe, and has neither a muscle attachment at its forward end, nor an enclosed ejaculatory duct. The tegminal arms have tooth-shaped lobes in front of the basal piece. The median lobe unequivocally identifies this species – it is far more slender than in Pseudischyrus nigrans, and unlike in P.ventriloquax its underside is perfectly straight before the tip. The female genitalia of P.extricatus also resemble those of T.humeralis, in particular the genital tube, whose valvifers lack ventral baculi. It has a characteristic lengthwise sclerotized patch in the midline of the vulvar lobe, which is not found in the other Pseudischyrus species. Compared to P.nigrans, the end segments of the coxites are shorter and straighter, whereas the styli are larger and longer; the latter trait, as well as the larger overall size of the genital tube, also distinguish it from P.ventriloquax.

Wings and legs
Members of this genus have a fully functional set of two pairs of wings, with the tough elytra covering the parchment-like foldable hindwings at rest. The elytra at their widest point are wider than the prothorax where it meets the elytra, and have regular rows of small punctuations.

The attachments of each leg pair are neither particularly close as in Triplax, nor conspicuously far away as in Tritoma. The tibiae widen conspicuously towards the tips, which on the hindlegs are slanted and rounded, ending in a blunt upper/outer angle; they have fairly long and thin bristles on the front side and around the corbel. Segment 4 of the tarsi is reduced, and attached to the upper centerside of segment 3.

Tibiae strongly, triangularly dilated apically; body ovoid, somewhat flattened; length 3–5 mm; clypeus with fine marginal bead along anterior margin; southeastern North America

== Distribution and ecology ==
P.extricatus is the most widespread member of its genus, occurring in much of the southern and central USA. Their western limit is probably near the 100th meridian west, a major biogeographic boundary. However, few actual records west of the 98th meridian west exist, and among more than a hundred specimens, none were found southwest of Blanco, Burnet and Goliad counties, and the San Antonio region, 120-150 miles (200-240 km) from the Mexican border. In the northeast, the genus has been recorded at Southern Pines in central North Carolina. To the northwest, records exist from eastern Kansas, but the species' range limits in the Great Plains region, where it is not rare, is still not well known; for example, as late as 1999 no specimens were known from Nebraska, suggesting that does not range north beyond Kansas.

The type specimen, number 6765 in the MCZ LeConte collection, was erroneously claimed to be from the "Middle States" by George Crotch when he described the species in 1873. However, it does not have the dark pink label used by LeConte for his "Middle States" specimens, but the red label with which he indicated Texan collections. The precise collection locality, however, is unknown, and the specimen was probably collected when the boundaries of Texas were still unresolved.

A specimen collected July 5 at San Diego, and another one collected July 9 at Alpine, both in San Diego County, California, in the extreme southwestern USA, are controversial. On examination of their genitalia, they proved to be P.extricatus, but as far as is known, no Pseudischyrus (and few close relatives) naturally occur west of the Rocky Mountains. If not mis-labeled, the Californian specimens were probably accidentally introduced by humans, perhaps in a long-range timber transport.

Despite being abundant and easily caught, almost nothing is known about the lifestyle of these beetles and their larvae. The unusual eyes suggest they are nocturnal animals with excellent low-light vision; like many of their relatives they can be attracted with lights at night. Like their relatives, they are forest dwellers that eat fungi – probably preferring the family Russulaceae – and hide under tree bark. Specimens have been collected at least between April and October, but mostly in July and August.
