= Tritoma angulata =

Scientific classification
- Kingdom: Animalia
- Phylum: Arthropoda
- Clade: Pancrustacea
- Class: Insecta
- Order: Coleoptera
- Suborder: Polyphaga
- Infraorder: Cucujiformia
- Family: Erotylidae
- Genus: Tritoma
- Species: T. angulata

Binomial name
- Tritoma angulata Say, 1826

Synonyms
- Tritoma angulatum (lapsus); Tritoma brunnea Lacordaire, 1842; Tritoma unicolor var. A Lacordaire, 1842 and see text

Species of beetle

Tritoma angulata is a species of small pleasing fungus beetle (family Erotylidae) endemic to the United States. It belongs to subfamily Tritominae, or – in taxonomic arrangements that prefer a more comprehensive subfamily Erotylinae – in tribe Tritomini of the Erotylinae.

== Description ==
This is a tiny beetle, about 2.6-4.35 mm long and 1.8-2.6 mm wide as adults. It is widely oval in shape, with the wingtips almost as blunt as the head; unlike most Tritoma, they lack contrasting red coloration on the elytra and/or pronotum. The adults are moderately shiny and almost entirely blackish, with a browner underside and head, and yellow-orange legs whose tibiae are conspicuously widened; the "stalks" of the antennae are also yellow-orange, while the "clubs" at the end are black. However, there is a rare color morph in which the head, prothorax, and scutellum are yellow-orange like the legs. Such individuals can be mistaken for T.erythrocephala, but their conspicuously widened tibia tips are distinctive. However, even noted Erotylidae expert George Crotch got fooled by the close similarity – the T. erythrocephala in his collection actually was a T.angulata, while one of his two supposed T.angulata was a Pseudischyrus nigrans. As typical for Tritoma sensu stricto, T.humeralis also has a triangular mentum, as well as an epistome whose tip is sharply cut off, causing the line running parallel to the epistome margin to angle towards the antennae insertions.

From its close relatives T.tenebrosa and T.unicolor, apart from the leg color it can also be distinguished by having punctures on the pronotum which are very uniformly sized and spaced, and by its tibia tips, which are wider than in T.unicolor, but not quite as expanded and less pointed at the end than in T.tenebrosa. T.angulata is also smaller on average than the other two, but with considerable overlap. Another highly similar pleasing fungus beetle found across the southern part of the range of T.angulata is Pseudischyrus extricatus, which differs in the structure of the genitalia, and – visible with a powerful magnifying glass without harming the beetle – the huge ommatidia of its compound eyes, which are much smaller in T.angulata. This difference is also relevant because it indicates that T.angulata is diurnal or crepuscular, while P.extricatus is decidedly nocturnal.

Head
The head has small compound eyes have tiny ommatidia, indicating a diurnal or crepuscular lifestyle, but with overall rather little reliance on eyesight. Its surface has loosely scattered, small and clearly demarked punctures. Adults possess file-like structures at the sides of the neck attachment, which, when the beetle wiggles its head, rub against the chitin and produce a squeaking sound; the degree of development of these structures is unreliable for distinguishing males and females. The epistome has a narrow but unbroken angled margin around the straight tip; a transverse stripe separates the margin from the bulk of the epistome. The "cheek" lobes below the compound eyes are vestigial, do not reach to the lower edge of the eyes, and are hidden by the ends of the maxillary palps. The antenna length is less than half of the pronotal base width, with antenna segment 3 almost as long as the segments 4 and 5 together, and a "clubbed" antenna tip which is about half again as long as it is wide and ends with a small segment 11.

The galea and lacinia of the maxilla resemble those of the related genera Ischyrus and Pseudischyrus; those of Triplax are also similar except for having two small curved teeth at the tip of the lacinia. The maxillary palps have an end segment that is rounded, somewhat triangular, and a bit more than half as long as it is wide; it lacks a conspicuous brush at the tip. The labium has a mentum that is mid-sized and fairly narrowly triangular. The labial palps end in a narrow segment with a strong bristle at the outer side and a tiny brush at the tip, and the mouth-cavity sides are flattened lobes.

Body, wings and legs
The prothorax is almost as wide at the base as the wings at their widest point. The pronotum is fairly wide and trapezoid-shaped, with the rear edge more than half again as long as the forward edge, and has the same pattern of uniformly small punctuations as the head, widely scattered except on the pronotal sides where they are a bit closer together. A thin margin runs around the sides and front of the pronotum, but is absent from the rear. In each corner of the pronotum, there is a small and inconspicuous pore. The prosternum is bell-shaped, with lengthwise lines at the center margin of the leg attachments extending to the forward edge of the prosternum and sharply curving towards each other in front of the leg attachments.

On the metasternum, the lines between the leg attachments are clearly engraved, and extend to about halfway between the rear edge of the leg attachment and the side of the metasternum. The scutellum is bluntly heart-shaped. The elytra are ornamented with regular lines of small punctuations; they also lack a distinct margin at the base, except for a very slim margin in front of the "shoulders".

The attachments of each leg pair are widely separated. The tibiae are strongly and conspicuously widened towards the ends; their upper/outer edge is narrowed to a very thin "razor edge" towards the tip. The first three segments of the tarsi are increasingly widened; segment 4 of the tarsi is reduced, attached to the upper centerside of segment 3, and rigidly joined to segment 5.

On the abdomen, coxal lines are present, and the intercoxal process is wide and has a cut-off or slightly rounded tip. Males and females do not have conspicuously different external abdominal structures. The aedeagus of the male genitalia resembles Pseudischyrus. The tegminal arms are firmly joined at the forward end, form a tooth-like lobe on the upper sides just in front of the basal piece, and have a narrow and almost membranous section below. The median strut does not exceed the median lobe in length. The internal sac is short and entirely hidden within the sclerotized median lobe; its anterior end lacks conspicuous point-like muscle attachments. The ejaculatory duct does not continue into the internal sac. The female genitalia are conspicuously shortened, but all parts are present and functional. Only the proctigeral and vulvar lobes are close to the typical size in Erotylidae; at the eighth abdominal segment, the genital tube has short and weakly sclerotized lines. The seminal receptacle is small, rounded, and bears a short well-sclerotized arm.

== Distribution and taxonomy ==
T.angulata is found in the eastern to central US, from the New England states to Michigan, Iowa and Nebraska in the north, and from Florida to central Missouri, Arkansas and central Texas in the south. Westwards its range extends at least to Washington County, Arkansas, and across the Missouri River at Kenosha in Cass County, Nebraska. There is also a single specimen whose collection locality is given as "Pasadena, Cal.", but this is probably erroneous. Records from the western limit of its range, e.g. Iowa and Nebraska, are scarce, but this beetle is usually under-recorded, being less prone to getting into Malaise traps than other Tritoma species.

The type specimen, like many beetles collected by Thomas Say, is probably lost; its type locality was not given more precisely than "United States", referring to the U.S. territory around 1820. Jean Lacordaire in his 1842 major review of pleasing fungus beetles described a "variety A" of T.unicolor; this beetle is almost certainly T.angulata. While it is quite clear that Lacordaire – at that time based in Paris – did not have access to Say's collected specimens, he apparently also could not consult Say's original descriptions, which were scattered over several volumes of the Journal of the Academy of Natural Sciences of Philadelphia and only became widely available in 1859 when John LeConte published his "Complete Writings" edition of Say's works.

Unable to compare his collections with Say's species, Lacordaire described T.angulata a second time in his 1842 review, as a supposedly new species named T.brunnea. This was erroneously moved to Pseudischyrus by Thomas Casey in 1916, because he mistook a specimen of the very similar P.extricatus for Lacordaire's T.brunnea. However, Lacordaire emphasized the tiny ommatidia of the compound eyes as a key trait of the species he assigned to Tritoma, while Pseudischyrus have (by Erotylidae standards) gigantic ommatidia, refuting the possibility that Lacordaire's T.brunnea specimen was a misidentified Pseudischyrus rather than a T.angulata.

"Tritoma livida", named by Jean Lacordaire in 1842, is an individual caught soon after emerging from the pupa; it was misidentified as a new species because it had not yet developed its mature coloration. Most likely, it belongs to T.biguttata affinis, but it might be a T.angulata.

== Ecology ==
To thrive, this species seems to require higher temperatures than many of its relatives: while they can be found on the wing at least from early March to mid-October, sizeable numbers of adults are noted only between June and early September. As noted above, they seem to have the same diurnal or crepuscular habits as other Tritoma, but are less likely to be caught in Malaise traps than usual for this genus.

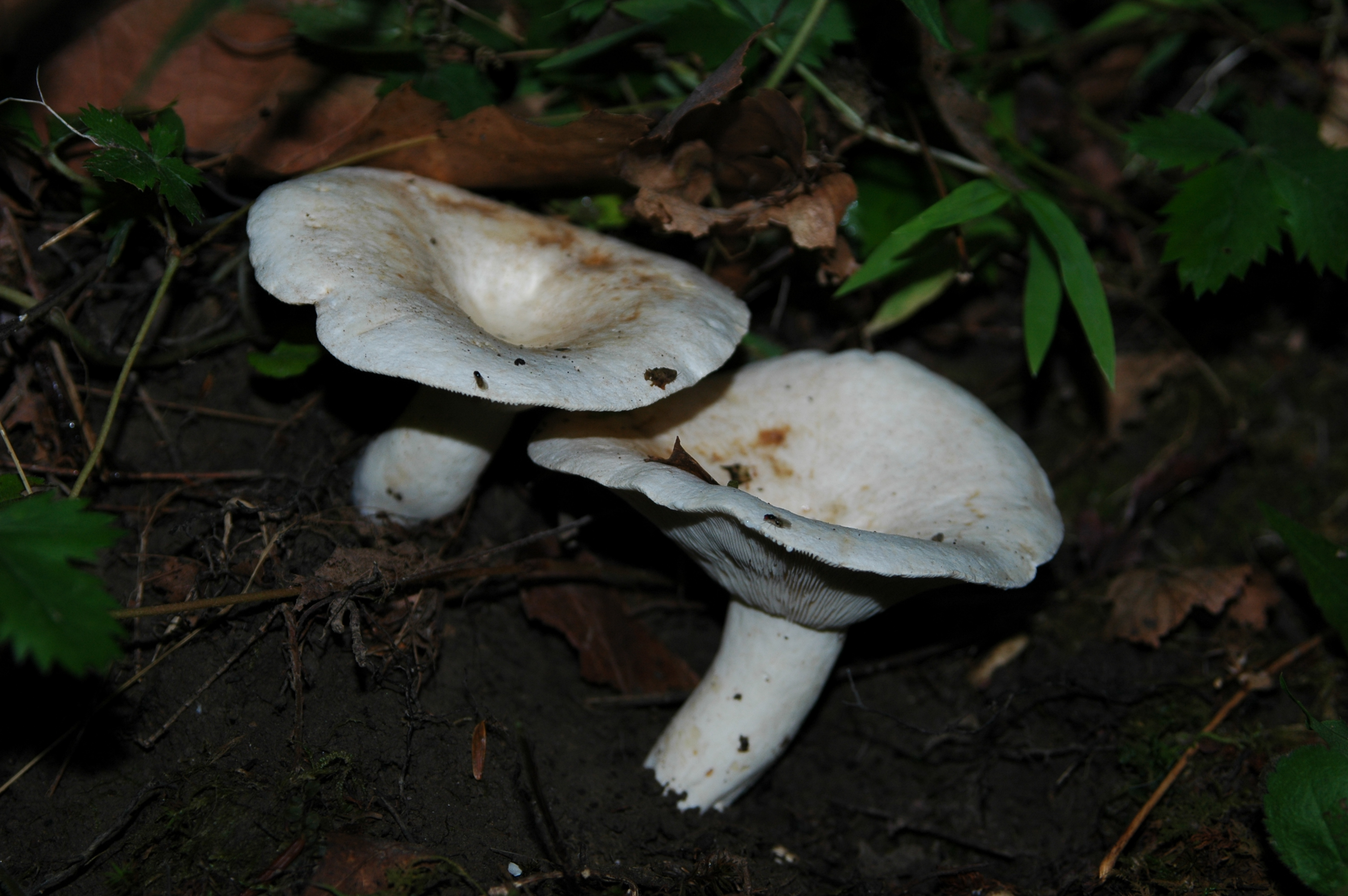
The favorite food of Tritoma angulata: Blancaccio mushrooms (Westmoreland County, Pennsylvania)

Like its closest relatives, T.angulata eats gilled fungi as larva and adults. Its main food source seems to be fungi of the "brittlegill" family Russulaceae in order Russulales. Among these, the blancaccio (Lactifluus piperatus) has been found most often in association with T.angulata and is also suitable as larval food, as is the related Lactifluus subvellereus which seems to be somewhat less popular with this beetle. But many records of T.angulata larvae exist from unidentified Russulaceae; probably, many members of the family are suitable as food for this beetle's adults, and several might even feed its more demanding larvae.

For adult T.angulata, the green brittlegill (Russula aeruginea) as well as R.mariae and R.subalbida also seem to be quite attractive, but somewhat less so than the two Lactiflua. Additional records of adult T.angulata are from species such as the weeping milkcap (Lactifluus volemus), Lactarius argillaceifolius, the birch milkcap (Lactarius tabidus), Lactarius zonarius, the boring white russula (Russula albidula), R.compacta, the crusty russula (R.crustosa), the emetic russula (R.emetica) or a related species, the stinking russula (R.foetens), R.paludosa, and the shrimp russula (R.xerampelina). Such rare records, like the occasional reports of T.angulata from non-Russulaceae fungi such as the ringless honey mushroom (Desarmillaria tabescens) of family Physalacriaceae in order Agaricales, do not necessarily imply that the beetles were actually feeding on those fungus species rather than simply sheltering there, or that the fungus in question was even correctly identified; at any rate, none of these species seems to be suitable as larval food. However, the larva of T.angulata and their development are still little-studied.
