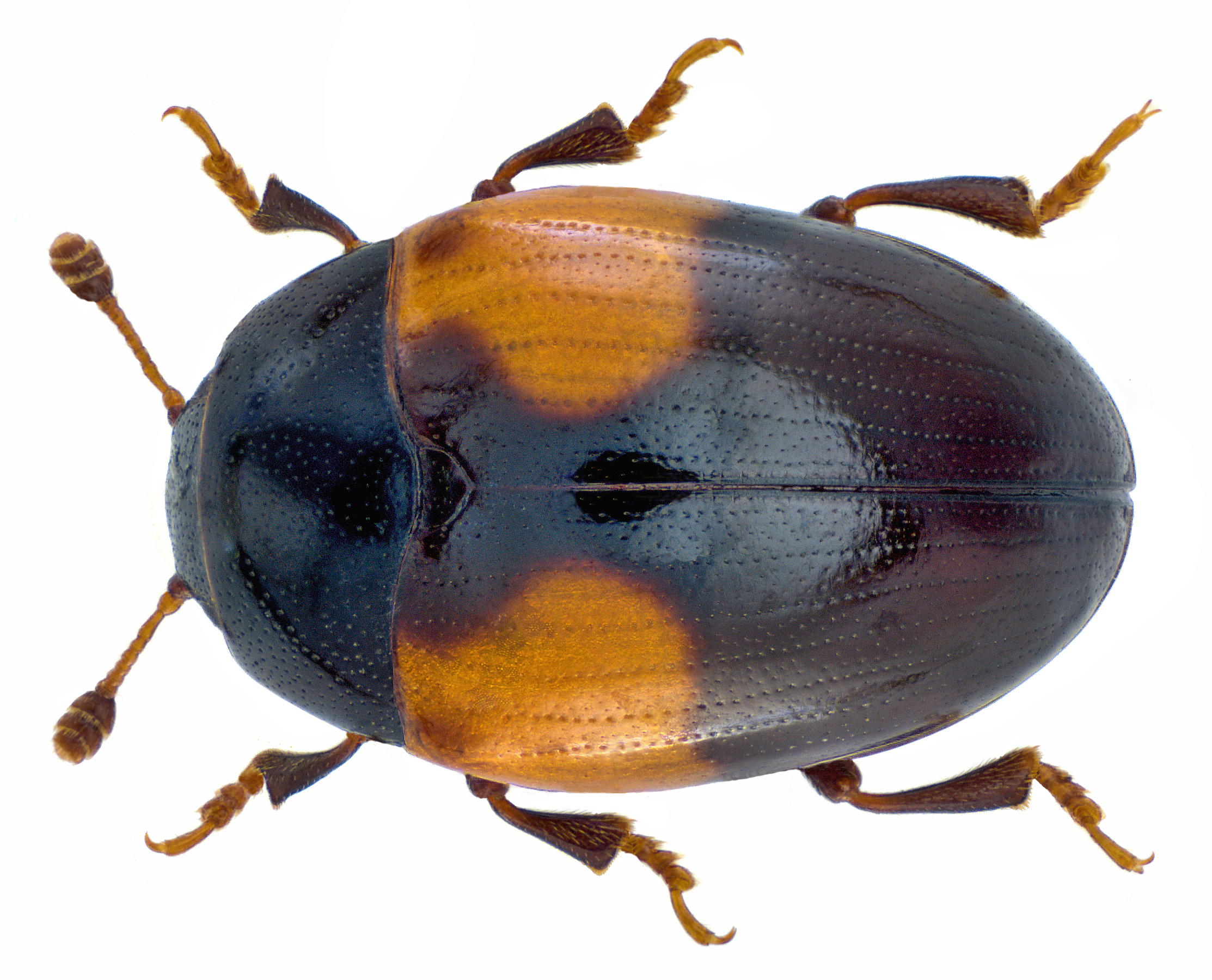
- Type species Tritoma bipustulata, adult from Kulmbach, Germany

Scientific classification
- Kingdom: Animalia
- Phylum: Arthropoda
- Clade: Pancrustacea
- Class: Insecta
- Order: Coleoptera
- Suborder: Polyphaga
- Infraorder: Cucujiformia
- Family: Erotylidae
- Tribe: Tritomini
- Genus: Tritoma; Fabricius, 1775

Type species
- Tritoma bipustulata Fabricius, 1775

Synonyms
- Cyrtotriplax Crotch, 1873; Tritoma Geoffroy, 1762 (unavailable); Tritoma Müller, 1764 (unavailable)

= Tritoma =

Genus of beetles

Tritoma is a large genus of beetles in the family Erotylidae, the pleasing fungus beetles. It is distributed mainly in the temperate parts of Eurasia, with a large evolutionary radiation in Japan. They are less diverse in North America (where a mere handful of species occur in the east) and the tropics (where records are scarce except for the abundant Tritoma dorsalis of Central America). Among its family, this genus is placed in subfamily Tritominae, or – in taxonomic arrangements that prefer a more comprehensive subfamily Erotylinae – in tribe Tritomini of the Erotylinae. As of 1999, over 100 species were recognized, and since then a handful of previously unknown ones has been described; however, the monophyly of Tritoma sensu lato is spurious and several species are being moved to new or revalidated genera in recent years.

== Description ==
Adult Tritoma beetles are small, generally less than one-quarter of an inch or 8 mm long and a bit more than half as wide. They have an oval body shape, widest slightly before the middle, with parabola-shaped wingtips and a blunter head. From the closely related genus Triplax, Tritoma sensu lato can be distinguished by a shorter and rounder body, with wider and more markedly tapering elytra, and long lines on the prosternum which extend forward of the attachment points of the forelegs and curve inwards towards the headward tip of the prosternum. The enigmatic and doubtfully distinct Pseudischyrus is extremely similar to Tritoma, but under a magnifying glass can immediately be recognized by their large compound eyes with huge ommatidia.

Like many of their relatives, these beetles usually have a black-and-reddish coloration. Usually, they are mostly black; the orange-red color is typically limited to two large spots on the "shoulders" of the elytra, to the pronotum, or to the underside. While slight differences in color pattern (such as a black vs orange underside) are often diagnostic for species, some Tritoma have subspecies or color morphs that strikingly differ in the location and extent of the orange-red markings.

Head
The head has small compound eyes have tiny ommatidia, indicating a diurnal or crepuscular lifestyle, but with overall rather little reliance on eyesight. All Tritoma adults possess file-like structures at the sides of the neck attachment, which, when the beetle wiggles its head, rub against the chitin and produce a squeaking sound; the degree of development of these structures is generally unreliable for distinguishing males and females. The epistome has a narrow but unbroken margin around the tip, which is either straight or slightly concave; a transverse stripe separates the margin from the bulk of the epistome. The "cheek" lobes below the compound eyes are vestigial, do not reach to the lower edge of the eyes, and are usually fully covered by the ends of the maxillary palps. The antenna length is less than half of the pronotal base width, with antenna segment 3 almost as long as the segments 4 and 5 together, and a "clubbed" antenna tip which is about half again as long as it is wide, usually only consists of the last 3 segments, and ends with a small segment 11.

The galea and lacinia of the maxilla resemble those of the related genera Ischyrus and Pseudischyrus; those of Triplax are also similar except for having two small curved teeth at the tip of the lacinia. The maxillary palps have an end segment that is rounded, somewhat triangular, and a bit more than half as long as it is wide. At a casual glance it does not seem to carry a brush, but in some species a vestigial brush is hidden within a slit at the tip. The labium has a mentum that is mid-sized and fairly narrowly triangular. The labial palps end in a narrow segment – less wide than the end segment of the maxillary palps – with a strong bristle at the outer side and a tiny brush at the tip, and the mouth-cavity sides are flattened lobes.

Body, wings and legs
The prothorax is almost as wide at the base as the wings at their widest point. The pronotum is fairly wide and trapezoid-shaped, with the rear edge more than half again as long as the forward edge. A thin margin runs around the sides and front of the pronotum, but is absent from the rear. In each corner of the pronotum, there is a small and inconspicuous pore. The prosternum is bell-shaped, with lengthwise lines at the center margin of the leg attachments extending to the forward edge of the prosternum, sharply curving towards each other in front of the leg attachments, and in some species even meeting at the tip of the prosternum to enclose a flattened triangular central area between them.

On the metasternum, the lines between the leg attachments are clearly engraved, and extend at least halfway between the rear edge of the leg attachment and the side of the metasternum. The scutellum is bluntly heart-shaped. The elytra are ornamented with regular lines of small punctuations; they also lack a distinct margin at the base, except for a very slim margin in front of the "shoulders".

The attachments of each leg pair are widely separated. The tibiae are widened towards the ends, very much so in some species but only slightly in others; their upper/outer edge is narrowed to a very thin "razor edge" towards the tip. On the forelegs, the tips of the tibiae are hollowed. The first three segments of the tarsi are increasingly widened; segment 4 of the tarsi is reduced, attached to the upper centerside of segment 3, and rigidly joined to segment 5.

On the abdomen, coxal lines are present, and the intercoxal process is wide and has a cut-off or slightly rounded tip. Males and females do not have conspicuously different external abdominal structures. The aedeagus of the male genitalia resembles Pseudischyrus. The tegminal arms are firmly joined at the forward end, form a tooth-like lobe on the upper sides just in front of the basal piece, and have a narrow and almost membranous section below. The median strut does not exceed the median lobe in length. The internal sac is of varying length but tends to be short and entirely hidden within the sclerotized median lobe; in some species it is longer and protrudes from the lobe's central hole to almost half the length of the median strut. Its anterior end lacks conspicuous point-like muscle attachments, but in some species has a number of short lengthwise sclerotized stripes. The ejaculatory duct does not continue into the internal sac. The female genitalia are strikingly shortened, seeming almost vestigial in some species, but all parts are present and functional. Only the proctigeral and vulvar lobes are close to the typical size in Erotylidae; at the eighth abdominal segment, the genital tube has short and usually weakly sclerotized lines. The seminal receptacle is small, rounded, and bears a short well-sclerotized arm. Overall, sclerotization of the female genitalia varies considerably between members of this genus, and in some Tritoma the styli are shortened to barely more than half their width.

== Distribution and ecology ==
Tritoma is a mostly Eurasian genus, with about 80% of its known diversity occurring there; they are more plentiful towards the east, but their European diversity still exceeds the total number of known species outside Eurasia. Only a single species each is known so far from Australia and the Neotropics, and about a dozen from sub-Saharan Africa; the number of North American species is not definitely resolved, but probably just a handful, all of which occur in the more humid regions to the east of the 100th meridian west.

Some Tritoma species consume euagaric mushrooms, staying concealed amidst the gills as they feed. Some feed on mushrooms growing from dead trees, as well as mycorrhizae on living roots. Unlike Triplax, which are often encountered in large groups on a single mushroom, Tritoma typically associate only in small numbers. Larvae and pupae of several species have been studied.

One of the most common pleasing fungus beetles in Europe, T.bipustulata, is a black beetle with red spots which engages in autohaemorrhaging as a defensive behavior.

== Taxonomy and systematics ==
Molecular analysis suggests that Tritoma in its traditional circumscription is paraphyletic, and even the few North American species seem to represent at least two well-distinct genera: The lineage containing the uniformly dark-winged T.erythrocephala and T.unicolor appears to be far more closely related to the iridescent Spondotriplax antennalis from New Guinea than to "T."pulchra with bicolored wings; the latter appears as sister to an unidentified species which resembles a member of the Neotropical genus Mycotretus but does not seem to be closely related to Mycotretus scitulus. Consequently, species such as "T."consobrina and "T."pulchra are often moved to the mostly Northeast Asian genus Aporotritoma nowadays, while "T."sanguinipennis is placed in Rotitma, likewise mainly Asian. But more research into the phylogeny of these beetles is needed to come to a robust conclusion on the most appropriate taxonomic treatment. Earlier authors had already noted that North American Tritoma sensu stricto usually feed on gilled fungi, while "T."pulchra and "T."sanguinipennis are typically found on polypores.

Historically, genera such as Motrita, Ortitma, Pseudotritoma, Trimota, Triplacidea and even Triplax were included in Tritoma by various authors, but nowadays they are generally considered distinct. Also, the enigmatic North American genus Pseudischyrus is so similar to certain Tritoma species even in the details of its genital anatomy that its distinctness requires verification; it probably also belongs into Tritoma sensu lato.

The only established synonym of genus Tritoma, Cyrtotriplax, is not available to use for split-off genera. It was proposed by George Crotch in 1873 to replace Tritoma. That name had been first used in Étienne Geoffroy's 1762 Histoire abrégée des Insectes for the genus commonly called Mycetophagus from the late 18th century onwards – these are hairy fungus beetles, superficially similar but not particularly closely related to the pleasing fungus beetles described as Tritoma by Johan Fabricius in 1775. This mix-up caused considerable misunderstanding among coleopterologists throughout the 19th and 20th century, until the ICZN in 1994 fixed Fabricius' publication as the official establishment of the genus and invalidated Geoffroy's description, conserving the use of Tritoma for the pleasing fungus beetle and Mycetophagus for the hairy fungus beetle. Cyrtotriplax, which used T.bipustulata as its type species just like Fabricius' Tritoma does, thus became an objective synonym, and unavailable for any split-off genera.

=== Species ===
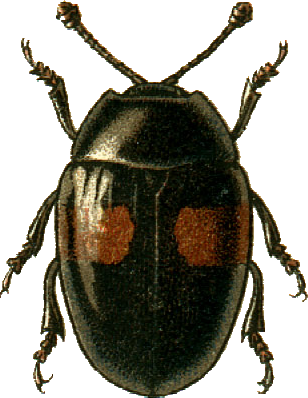
Tritoma subbasalis

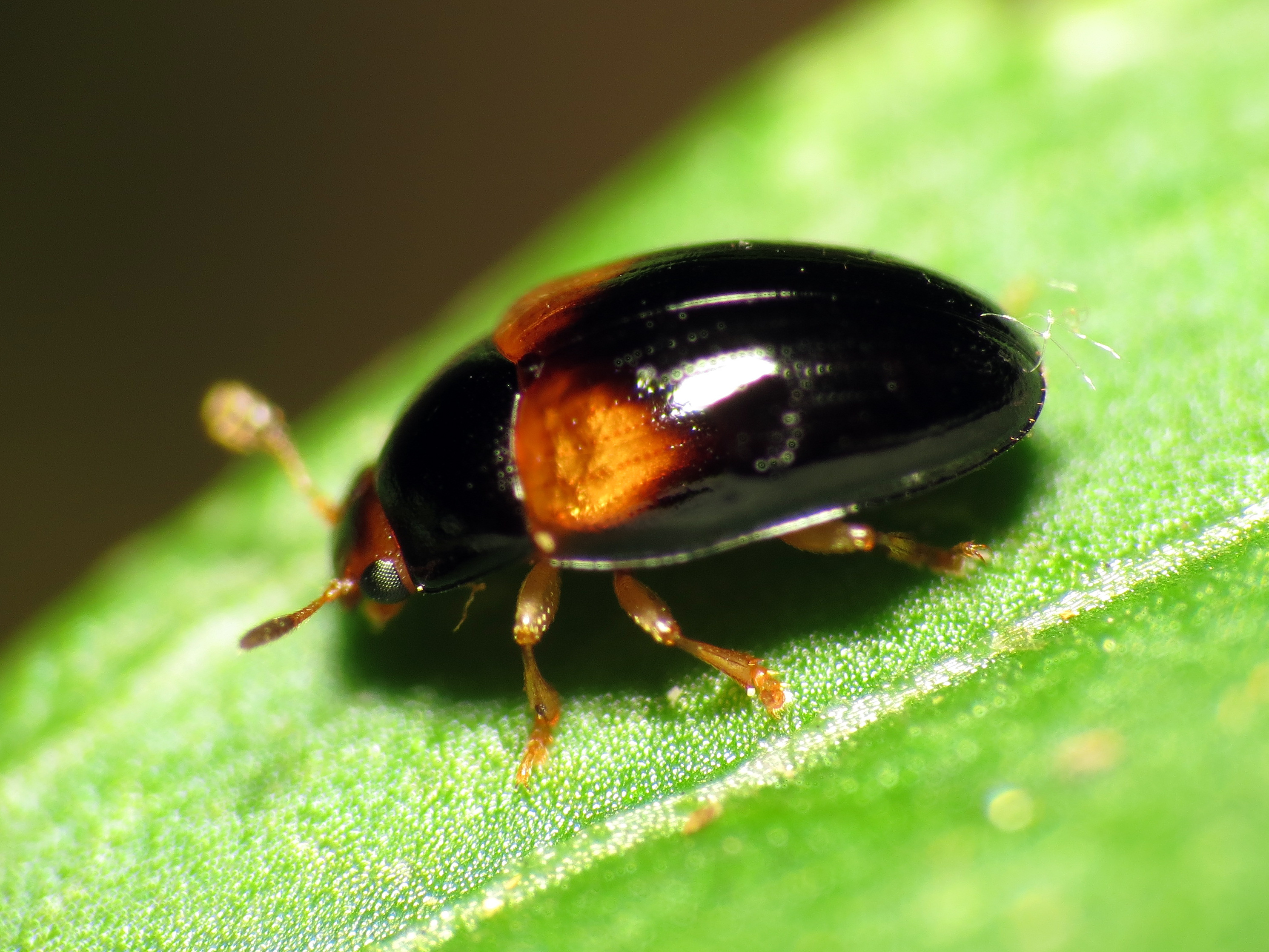
Unidentified Tritoma in Rock Creek Park, Washington DC, USA

This species list is provisional; several species listed here would probably warrant placement in another genus.

- Tritoma acuminata Mader, 1941
- Tritoma alternata Arrow, 1921 (1922)
- Tritoma amethystina Deelder, 1942
- Tritoma andoi Narukawa, 2003
- Tritoma angolensis Delkeskamp, 1962
- Tritoma angulata Say, 1826
- Tritoma antenigra Delkeskamp
- Tritoma arrowi Mader, 1934 (= T.ornata Arrow, 1921, nec Casey, 1916)
- Tritoma asahinai Nakane, 1950
- Tritoma atrata Lewis, 1887
- Tritoma atriceps Arrow, 1921 (1922)
- Tritoma atripennis (Gorham, 1885)
- Tritoma atriventris LeConte, 1847 (disputed)
- Tritoma aulica (Horn, 1871) (disputed)
- Tritoma aurantica Arrow, 1925
- Tritoma barbara Delkeskamp, 1943
- Tritoma basimaculata Kuhnt, 1908
- Tritoma biguttata (Say, 1825) – two-spotted tritoma (= T.affinis, T.basalis, T.caseyi, T.carolinae, T.nigripennis Casey, 1916, nec Motschulsky, 1858, T.pinorum)
- Tritoma biplagiata (Lewis, 1887) (= T.solivaga Yasumatsu, 1937 nec Lewis, 1887)
- Tritoma bipustulata Fabricius, 1775 (= T.bicolor, T.bimaculata, T.humeralis (Marsham, 1802) non Fabricius, 1801, T.incerta, T.pulchra (Reitter, 1887) non Say, 1826)
- Tritoma bisignata Chûjô, 1967
- Tritoma bivunculata Heller, 1918 (1920)
- Tritoma cameruna Deelder, 1942
- Tritoma cenchris (Lewis, 1887)
- Tritoma centralis (Lewis, 1887)
- Tritoma chujoi Delkeskamp, 1962
- Tritoma colorata Delkeskamp, 1962
- Tritoma conradti (Gorham, 1900)
- Tritoma cribripennis Arrow, 1926
- Tritoma crotchi (Chûjô, 1968)
- Tritoma digitalis Arrow, 1925
- Tritoma discaloides Nakane, 1986 (= T.discalis Nakane, 1986 nec Chûjô, 1969)
- Tritoma dorsalis Gorham, 1888
- Tritoma elegans Arrow, 1928
- Tritoma endomychus Heller, 1918 (1920)
- Tritoma excellens Arrow, 1925
- Tritoma eximia Arrow, 1925
- Tritoma erythrocephala Lacordaire, 1842 – red-headed tritoma (= T.flavipes Lacordaire, 1842 (non Panzer, 1792: preoccupied); disputed)
- Tritoma fasciata Chûjô, 1941
- Tritoma felix Arrow, 1925
- Tritoma flavipes Panzer, 1792
- Tritoma festiva Delkeskamp, 1962
- Tritoma fornicata Delkeskamp, 1962
- Tritoma fulva (Reitter, 1879)
- Tritoma goudoti (Lacordaire)
- Tritoma gressitti (Chûjô, 1968)
- Tritoma hakusanensis Sasaji & Hoshina, 2003
- Tritoma haematosoma (Lacordaire)
- Tritoma humeralis Fabricius, 1801
- Tritoma imugina Heller, 1923
- Tritoma indica (Crotch, 1876)
- Tritoma infanta Arrow, 1925
- Tritoma kanekoi Araki, 1943
- Tritoma karahutonis Chûjô, 1941
- Tritoma kensakui Chûjô, 1955
- Tritoma kolbei Deelder, 1942
- Tritoma kubotai Narukawa, 1994
- Tritoma kuhnti (M.Chûjô & M.T.Chûjô, 1990) (= T.atripennis Kuhnt, 1909, nec Gorham, 1885)
- Tritoma kurinoensis Nakane, 1982
- Tritoma lagunae Heller, 1918 (1920)
- Tritoma latericincta Delkeskamp
- Tritoma lateripunctata Mader, 1936
- Tritoma latifascia Heller, 1918 (1920) (= T.helleri)
- Tritoma latifasciata (Lewis, 1887) (= T.basalis (Lewis, 1887) non Lacordaire, 1842, T.lewisiana)
- Tritoma laxicornis Arrow, 1925
- Tritoma leleupi Delkeskamp, 1962
- Tritoma lini (Chûjô, 1968)
- Tritoma lobicollis Arrow, 1925
- Tritoma lobisternum Arrow, 1925
- Tritoma loochooana (Chûjô, 1969)
- Tritoma maackii (Crotch, 1876)
- Tritoma maculifrons (Lewis, 1887)
- Tritoma maculosa Delkeskamp, 1962
- Tritoma malaisei Arrow, 1939
- Tritoma marginicollis Chûjô, 1967
- Tritoma maxillosa Delkeskamp, 1962
- Tritoma melanopa Arrow, 1925
- Tritoma metasobrina Chûjô, 1941
- Tritoma methneri Delkeskamp, 1962
- Tritoma michitakai Chûjô, 1960
- Tritoma mimetica (Crotch, 1873)
- Tritoma minutissima Delkeskamp, 1962
- Tritoma miyatai Narukawa, 2010
- Tritoma moeroensis Delkeskamp, 1962
- Tritoma nigribasis Arrow, 1925
- Tritoma nigrina (Gorham, 1900) (= T.africana, T.tibialis)
- Tritoma nigripes Heller, 1923
- Tritoma nigrobasalis Heller, 1918 (1920)
- Tritoma nigropicta Arrow, 1925
- Tritoma nigropunctata (Lewis, 1887)
- Tritoma nilgiria Arrow, 1925
- Tritoma niponensis (Lewis, 1874)
- Tritoma obscura (Gorham, 1896)
- Tritoma octonotata (Bedel, 1874)
- Tritoma octopunctata Bedel, 1874
- Tritoma okadomei (Chûjô, 1974)
- Tritoma osawai Nakane, 1981
- Tritoma otaitoensis Nakane, 1961
- Tritoma ozakii Narukawa, 2000
- Tritoma pallidicincta (Lewis, 1887)
- Tritoma pantherina (Lewis, 1887)
- Tritoma partita Arrow, 1917
- Tritoma pectoralis Delkeskamp, 1962
- Tritoma perrieri Fairmaire
- Tritoma picta Arrow, 1926
- Tritoma pulchella Fabricius, 1789
- Tritoma pura Delkeskamp, 1962
- Tritoma quatei (Chûjô, 1968)
- Tritoma quinquemaculata Mader, 1941
- Tritoma recurrens Arrow, 1925
- Tritoma rufa Delkeskamp, 1962
- Tritoma sasajii Narukawa, 2001
- Tritoma scheerpeltzi Mader, 1955
- Tritoma scutigera Arrow, 1925
- Tritoma senegalensis Crotch (formerly in Amblyopus)
- Tritoma shibatai (Chûjô, 1969)
- Tritoma shimoyamai Chûjô & Nakane, 1950
- Tritoma shirakii Chûjô, 1936
- Tritoma senegalensis Crotch, 1876
- Tritoma sobrina (Lewis, 1887) (= T.consobrina (Reitter, 1896) non Lewis, 1874)
- Tritoma solitaria Arrow, 1921
- Tritoma spenceri (Chûjô, 1968)
- Tritoma standhali (Chûjô, 1968)
- Tritoma subbasalis (Reitter, 1896) (= T.consobrina (Reitter, 1887) non Lewis, 1874, T.jakowlewi, T.sibirica)
- Tritoma sungkangensis Nakane, 1966
- Tritoma taiwana Chûjô, 1936 (= "T.atripennis" Miwa, 1931, nec Gorham, 1885: nomen nudum)
- Tritoma takahashii Nakane, 1966
- Tritoma takakurai Nakane, 1979
- Tritoma takasagona Chûjô, 1941
- Tritoma tenebrosa Fall, 1912 – darkling tritoma
- Tritoma tessmanni Delkeskamp, 1962
- Tritoma testakeicornis Heller, 1918 (1920)
- Tritoma towadensis Chûjô, 1952 (=T.yachiensis)
- Tritoma toyoshimai Narukawa, 2010
- Tritoma triguttata Heller, 1918 (1920)
- Tritoma tripartiaria (Lewis, 1887)
- Tritoma unicolor Say, 1826
- Tritoma uniplagiata Nakane, 1983
- Tritoma viridipennis Arrow, 1925
- Tritoma vitticollis Arrow, 1921 (1922)
- Tritoma wittei Delkeskamp
- Tritoma wittmeri (Chûjô, 1975)
- Tritoma xanthogaster Delkeskamp, 1962
- Tritoma yamazii Chûjô, 1941
- Tritoma yiei Nakane, 1966

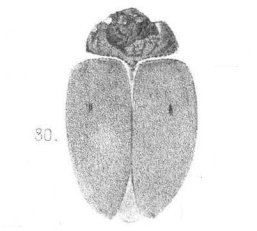
The fossil ?Tritoma binotata

"Tritoma livida", named by Jean Lacordaire in 1842, is an individual caught soon after emerging from the pupa; it was misidentified as a new species because it had not yet developed its mature coloration. Most likely, it belongs to either T.biguttata affinis or to T.angulata.

A supposed Tritoma species from Isla de Mona near Puerto Rico collected by J. A. Ramos in the early 20th century is actually a species of the monommatine beetle genus Hyporhagus. These deceptively resemble certain erotylid beetles (such as Tritoma) in overall appearance, but actually belong to another branch of Cucujiformia. With the proposed occurrence of "Tritoma sellata" on Cuba apparently being in error too, as of 2009, no verified Tritoma records were known from the Caribbean offshore islands.

In addition, a fossil Erotylidae beetle described originally as Mycotretus binotata by Samuel Scudder in 1878 has been assigned to Tritoma due to its great resemblance to "T." sanguinipennis; it would probably belong to Rotitma if "T." sanguinipennis is validly placed there. Its specimen MCZ 4183 was found in the Lake Gosiute Green River Formation of Wyoming and originally assumed to be of Oligocene age; today, it is assumed to have been lived somewhat later, in the Early Eocene roughly 50 million years ago.

There are also fossil remains from Baltic amber that were assigned to this genus.
