= Tritoma tenebrosa =

Scientific classification
- Kingdom: Animalia
- Phylum: Arthropoda
- Clade: Pancrustacea
- Class: Insecta
- Order: Coleoptera
- Suborder: Polyphaga
- Infraorder: Cucujiformia
- Family: Erotylidae
- Genus: Tritoma
- Species: T. tenebrosa

Binomial name
- Tritoma tenebrosa Fall, 1912

Species of beetle

Tritoma tenebrosa, the darkling tritoma, is a species of small pleasing fungus beetle (family Erotylidae) endemic to the USA. It belongs to subfamily Tritominae, or – in taxonomic arrangements that prefer a more comprehensive subfamily Erotylinae – in tribe Tritomini of the Erotylinae.

== Description ==
Even though the darkling tritoma is among the larger Tritoma species, it is still a tiny beetle, about 3.8-5.7 mm long and 2.4-3.5 mm wide as adults. It is oval in shape, with the wingtips almost as blunt as the head, and somewhat more slender than most of its relatives. At a casual glance, they look like a diminutive darkling beetle (family Tenebrionidae), appearing matte blackish-brown all over – tenebrosa and Tenebrionidae deriving from Latin tenebrae "shadows". Seen close, the "stems" of the antennae, the mouthparts, the tarsi of the legs (and in some individuals, the rest of the legs and the abdomen whole or in part) are somewhat lighter. The carapace is covered in a somewhat microscopic reticulated relief that renders the surface dull, without the more or less pronounced sheen usually seen in Tritoma.

The possible close relative T.unicolor is similar, but even darker; it is recognizable with a magnifying glass by the punctures of the pronotum, which are conspicuously large and few in T.unicolor, and much more numerous and smaller at the sides. T.tenebrosa has two lengthwise stripes of dense large punctures near the sides of the pronotum, and a few tiny punctures in the center. In addition, the tibiae of T.unicolor are much less flaring at the tips. But even noted Erotylidae expert George Crotch got fooled by the close similarity – one of the supposedly two T. unicolor in his collection actually was a T.tenebrosa. T.angulata resembles a yellow-legged T.tenebrosa, but its pronotal punctures are widely and almost evenly strewn, only slightly more dense-packed at the sides, and of uniformly smallish size. Another similar relative is Pseudischyrus extricatus, which differs in the structure of the genitalia, and – visible with a powerful magnifying glass without harming the beetle – the huge ommatidia of its compound eyes, which are much smaller in T.tenebrosa. This difference is also relevant because it indicates that T.tenebrosa is diurnal or crepuscular, while P.extricatus is decidedly nocturnal.

Head
The head has small compound eyes have tiny ommatidia, indicating a diurnal or crepuscular lifestyle, but with overall rather little reliance on eyesight. Its surface is so densely covered in large punctures that the puncture's distance is less than their diameter. Adults possess file-like structures at the sides of the neck attachment, which, when the beetle wiggles its head, rub against the chitin and produce a squeaking sound; the degree of development of these structures is unreliable for distinguishing males and females. The epistome has a narrow but unbroken angled margin around the straight tip; a transverse stripe separates the margin from the bulk of the epistome. The "cheek" lobes below the compound eyes are vestigial, do not reach to the lower edge of the eyes, and are hidden by the ends of the maxillary palps. The antenna length is less than half of the pronotal base width, with antenna segment 3 almost as long as the segments 4 and 5 together, and a "clubbed" antenna tip which is about half again as long as it is wide and ends with a small segment 11.

The galea and lacinia of the maxilla resemble those of the related genera Ischyrus and Pseudischyrus; those of Triplax are also similar except for having two small curved teeth at the tip of the lacinia. The maxillary palps have an end segment that is rounded, somewhat triangular, and a bit more than half as long as it is wide; it lacks a conspicuous brush at the tip. The labium has a mentum that is mid-sized and fairly narrowly triangular, as typical for Tritoma sensu stricto; the labial palps end in a narrow segment with a strong bristle at the outer side and a tiny brush at the tip. The epistome whose tip is sharply cut off, causing the line running parallel to the epistome margin to angle towards the antennae insertions, and the mouth-cavity sides are flattened lobes.

Body, wings and legs
The prothorax is almost as wide at the base as the wings at their widest point. The pronotum is fairly wide and trapezoid-shaped, with the rear edge more than half again as long as the forward edge. In its center, it has only sparse, shallow and small punctures; towards the sides, they become mid-sized, deeper and denser, and along the very edge of the pronotal sides there is a narrow stripe where the punctures are again small. A thin margin runs around the sides and front of the pronotum, but is absent from the rear. In each corner of the pronotum, there is a small and inconspicuous pore. The prosternum is bell-shaped, with lengthwise lines at the center margin of the leg attachments extending to the forward edge of the prosternum and sharply curving towards each other in front of the leg attachments.

On the metasternum, the lines between the leg attachments are clearly engraved, and extend to about halfway between the rear edge of the leg attachment and the side of the metasternum. The scutellum is bluntly heart-shaped. The elytra are ornamented with regular lines of small punctuations, with extremely tiny punctures scattered between these lines; they also lack a distinct margin at the base, except for a very slim margin in front of the "shoulders".

The attachments of each leg pair are widely separated. The tibiae are extremely widened towards the ends (even more than in T.angulata if anything); their upper/outer edge is narrowed to a very thin "razor edge" towards the tip, which is sharply cut-off and pointed, at almost a right angle in the hindlegs.The first three segments of the tarsi are increasingly widened; segment 4 of the tarsi is reduced, attached to the upper centerside of segment 3, and rigidly joined to segment 5.

On the abdomen, coxal lines are present, and the intercoxal process is wide and has a cut-off or slightly rounded tip. Males and females do not have conspicuously different external abdominal structures. The aedeagus of the male genitalia resembles Pseudischyrus. The tegminal arms are firmly joined at the forward end, form a tooth-like lobe on the upper sides just in front of the basal piece, and have a narrow and almost membranous section below. The median strut does not exceed the median lobe in length. The internal sac is short and entirely hidden within the sclerotized median lobe; its anterior end lacks conspicuous point-like muscle attachments. The ejaculatory duct does not continue into the internal sac. The female genitalia are conspicuously shortened, but all parts are present and functional. Only the proctigeral and vulvar lobes are close to the typical size in Erotylidae; at the eighth abdominal segment, the genital tube has short and weakly sclerotized lines. The seminal receptacle is small, rounded, and bears a short well-sclerotized arm.

== Range and ecology ==
T.tenebrosa was described from a specimen (MCZ 24492 in the Fall collection) taken by A.H.Manee at Southern Pines, North Carolina on September 8, 1911. They are found in the USA east of the Mississippi River, from Florida at least to Lucedale, Mississippi, and in the north from southern New York and Pennsylvania (where it ranges at least to the New York City area and Allegheny County, respectively) to Illinois.

Although this species does not seem to be particularly rare, almost nothing is known about its ecology. Specimens have been collected from late April to late October, but at the northern end of their range (where dated records are very scarce) they probably emerge from winter quarters later, and retreat earlier. Like its closest relatives, T.tenebrosa presumably eats gilled fungi as larva and adults. With no field data, and since its presumed closest relatives have each specialized in entirely different lineages of Agaricomycetes as their main food, the preferences of T.tenebrosa remain utterly unknown.
