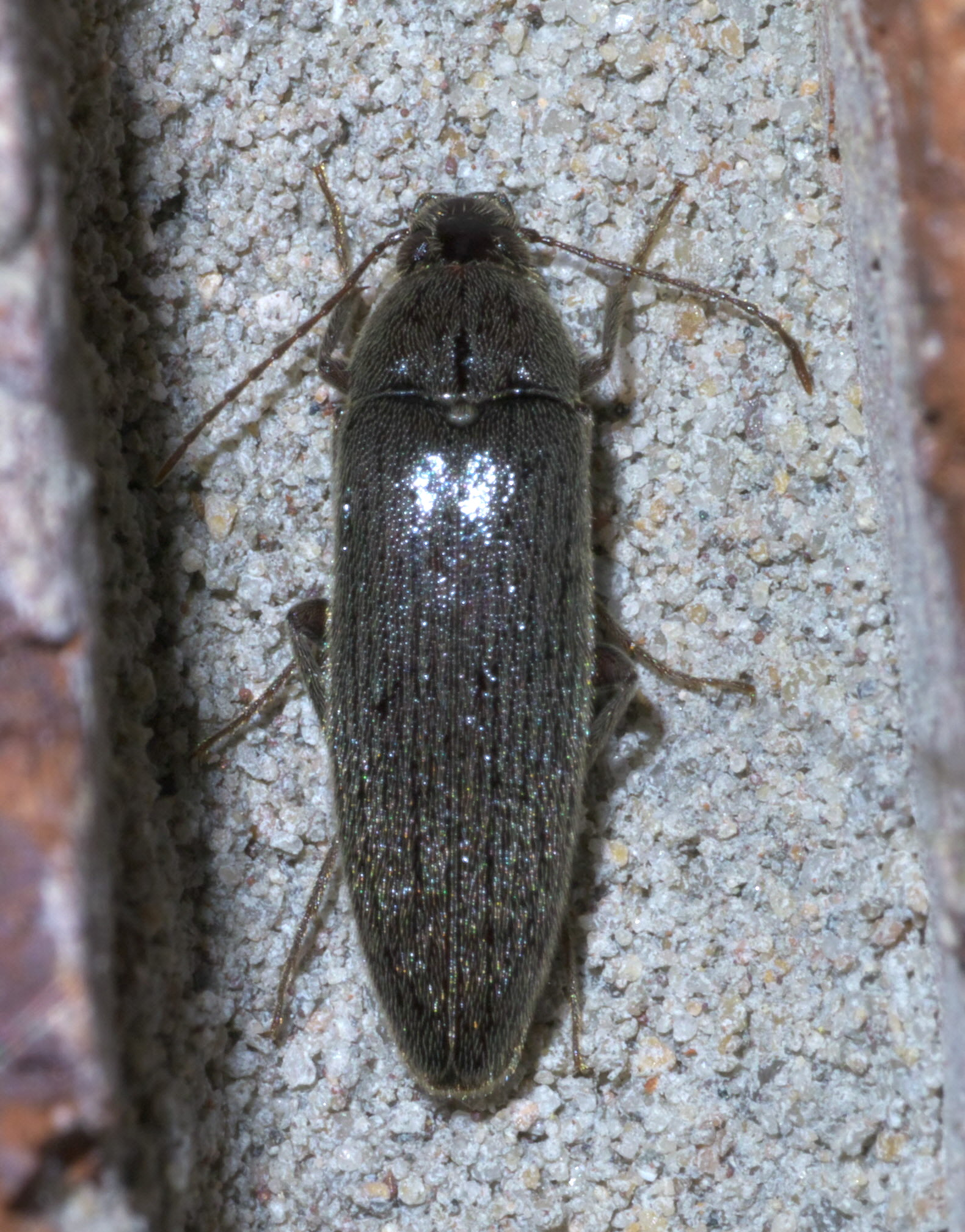

Scientific classification
- Domain: Eukaryota
- Kingdom: Animalia
- Phylum: Arthropoda
- Class: Insecta
- Order: Coleoptera
- Suborder: Polyphaga
- Infraorder: Cucujiformia
- Family: Synchroidae
- Genus: Synchroa
- Species: S. punctata

Binomial name
- Synchroa punctata Newman, 1838

= Synchroa punctata =

Species of beetle

Synchroa punctata is a species of synchroa bark beetle in the family Synchroidae. It is native to North America.

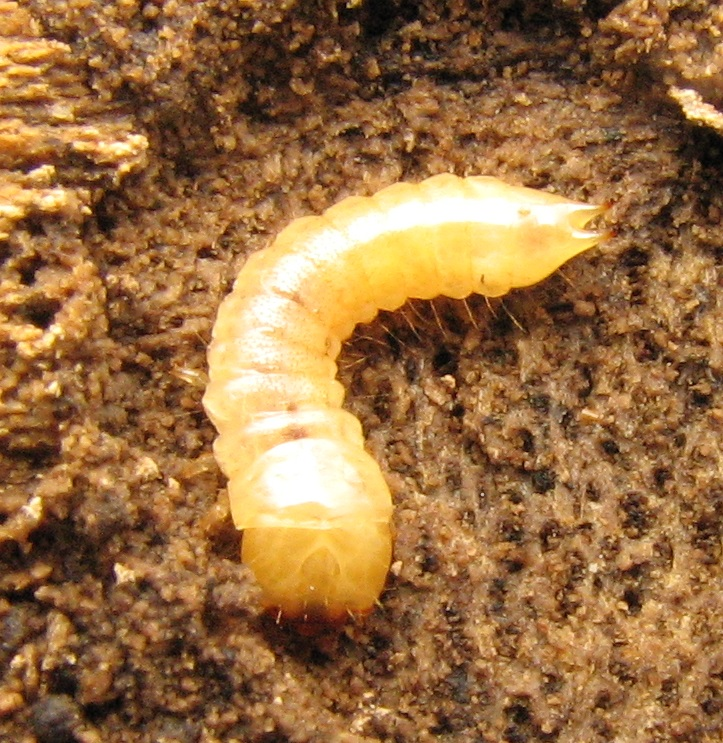
Larva under bark
