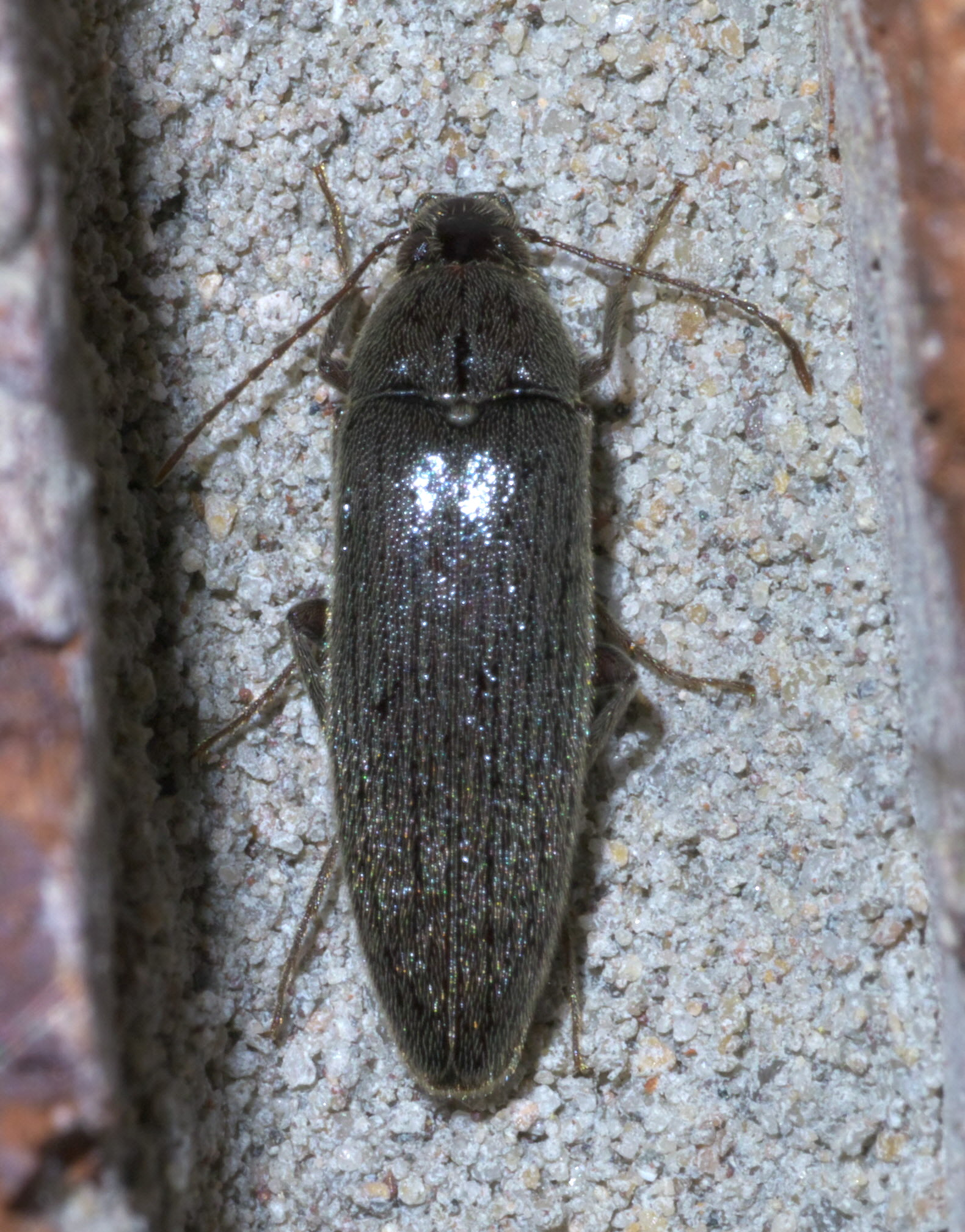
- Synchroa punctata, adult
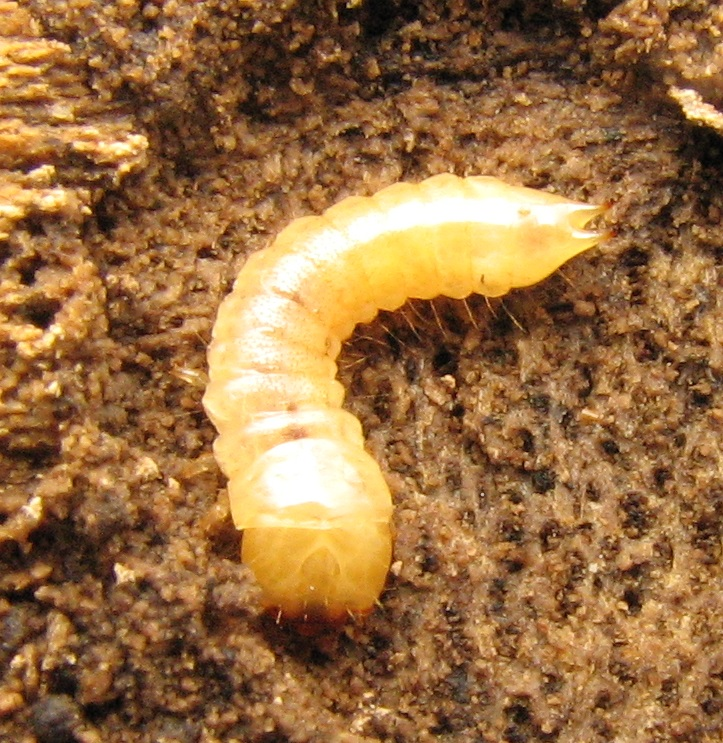
- Synchroa punctata, larva

Scientific classification
- Kingdom: Animalia
- Phylum: Arthropoda
- Clade: Pancrustacea
- Class: Insecta
- Order: Coleoptera
- Suborder: Polyphaga
- Infraorder: Cucujiformia
- Superfamily: Tenebrionoidea
- Family: Synchroidae; Lacordaire, 1859

Genera
- See text

= Synchroidae =

Family of beetles

The Synchroidae are a small family of tenebrionoid beetles with no vernacular common name. The family consists of three extant genera, Mallodrya, Synchroa, and Synchroina, with a total of nine species., which are found in North America, East Asia and Southeast Asia. The larvae of species of Synchroa are known to feed on rotting cambium tissue found in deciduous trees, with adults being nocturnal. Most Synchroidae have been found to be within 10.0-13.00 mm in length.
