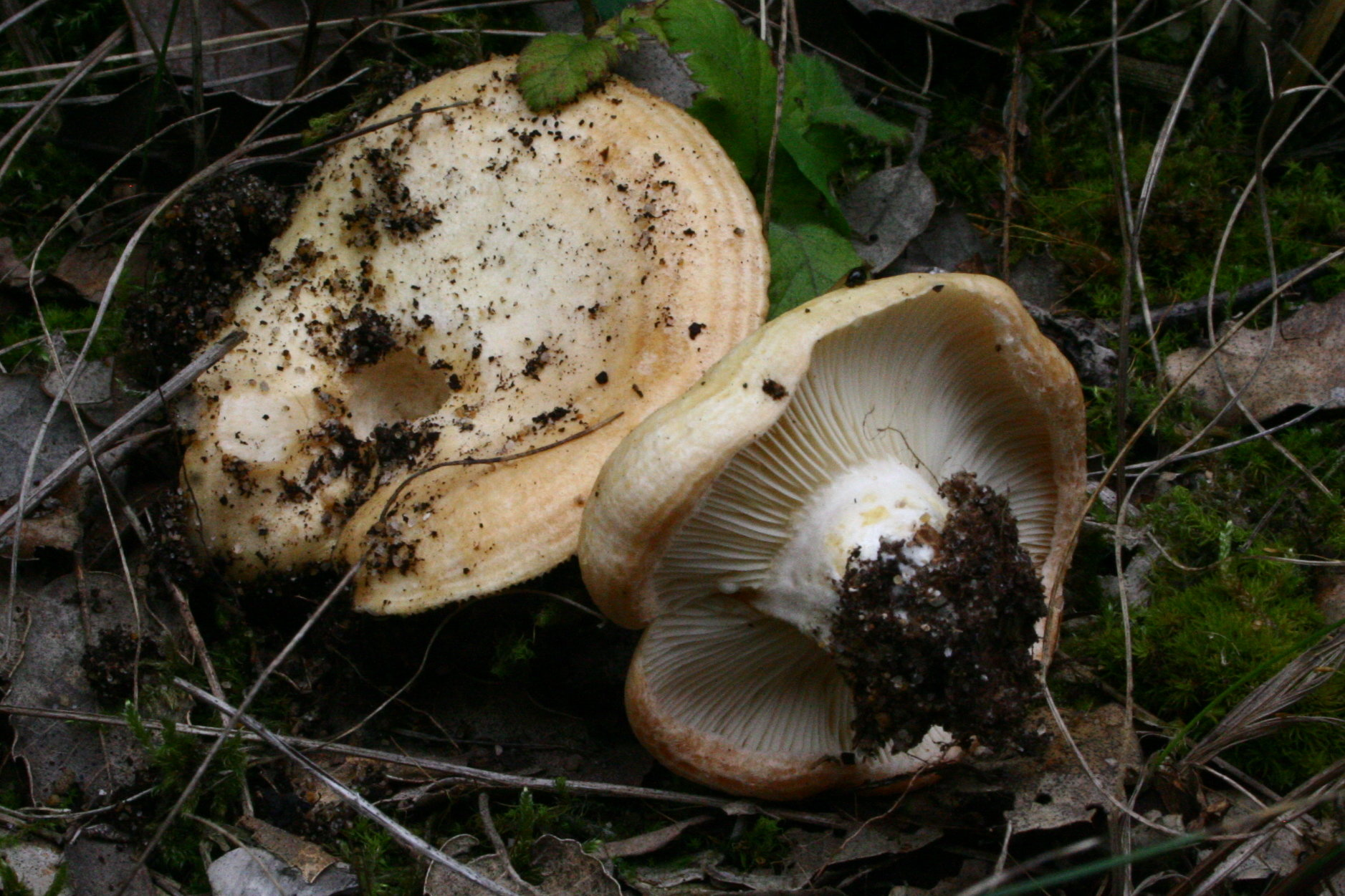

Scientific classification
- Kingdom: Fungi
- Division: Basidiomycota
- Class: Agaricomycetes
- Order: Russulales
- Family: Russulaceae
- Genus: Lactarius
- Species: L. zonarius

Binomial name
- Lactarius zonarius (Bull.) Fr. (1838)

Synonyms
- Agaricus zonarius Bull. 1783; Agaricus insulsus Fr. 1821; Lactarius insulsus (Fr.) Fr. 1838; Galorrheus insulsus (Fr.) P. Kumm. 1871; Galorrheus zonarius (Fr.) P. Kumm. 1871; Lactifluus insulsus (Fr.) Kuntze 1891; Lactifluus zonarius (Fr.) Kuntze 1891; Lactarius lividus (Lambotte) Massee 1902; Gloeocybe insulsa (Fr.) Earle 1909; Lactarius scrobipes Kühner & Romagn. 1954

= Lactarius zonarius =

Species of fungus

Lactarius zonarius is a member of the large milk-cap genus Lactarius in the order Russulales. It was first described in 1783, under the basionym Agaricus zonarius. A rare, poisonous fungus, it can be found in Europe and North America.

Adults of the pleasing fungus beetle Tritoma angulata have been recorded from this mushroom, but it does not seem to be a regular food source for them.

== Description ==
The mushroom cap has a cream-yellow to cream-orange color, and measures from 4 to 16 cm. The mushroom's insides are white and fleshy, and produce a white latex when cut. The stem measures 2 to 5 centimeters in length, and between 1 and 2 cm in diameter.

== See also ==
- List of Lactarius species
