= Hyporhagus gilensis =

Scientific classification
- Domain: Eukaryota
- Kingdom: Animalia
- Phylum: Arthropoda
- Class: Insecta
- Order: Coleoptera
- Suborder: Polyphaga
- Infraorder: Cucujiformia
- Family: Zopheridae
- Genus: Hyporhagus
- Species: H. gilensis

Binomial name
- Hyporhagus gilensis Horn, 1872

Species of beetle

Hyporhagus gilensis is a species of opossum beetle in the family Zopheridae. It is found in North America.

== Subspecies ==
- Hyporhagus gilensis californicus Freude, 1955
- Hyporhagus gilensis gilensis Horn, 1872
- Hyporhagus gilensis opuntiae Horn, 1872
- Hyporhagus gilensis texanus Linell, 1899
