= Hyporhagus punctulatus =

Scientific classification
- Domain: Eukaryota
- Kingdom: Animalia
- Phylum: Arthropoda
- Class: Insecta
- Order: Coleoptera
- Suborder: Polyphaga
- Infraorder: Cucujiformia
- Family: Zopheridae
- Subfamily: Zopherinae
- Genus: Hyporhagus
- Species: H. punctulatus

Binomial name
- Hyporhagus punctulatus Thomson, 1860

Species of beetle

Hyporhagus punctulatus is a species of opossum beetle in the family Zopheridae. It is found in North America.
