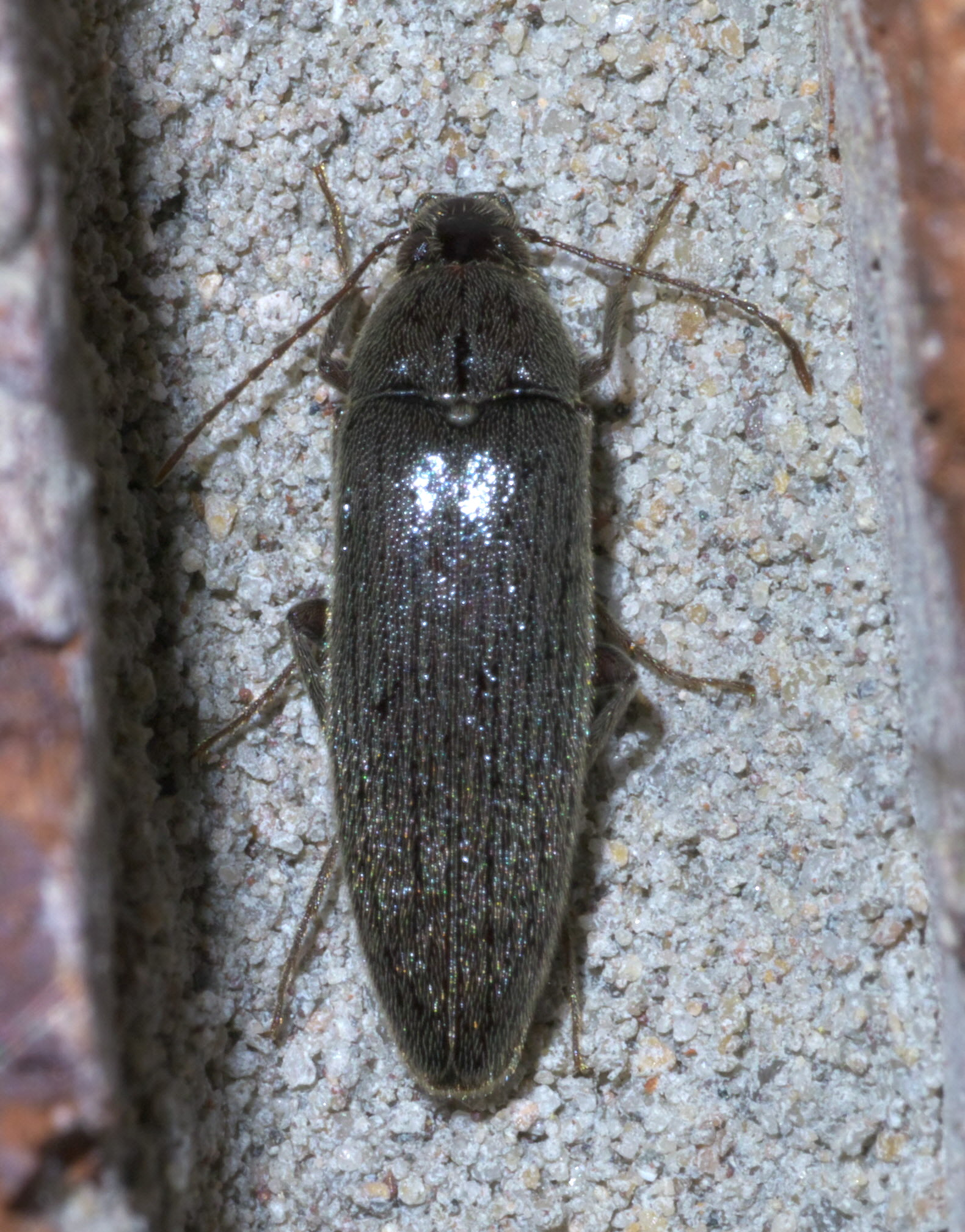
- Synchroa punctata

Scientific classification
- Domain: Eukaryota
- Kingdom: Animalia
- Phylum: Arthropoda
- Class: Insecta
- Order: Coleoptera
- Suborder: Polyphaga
- Infraorder: Cucujiformia
- Family: Synchroidae
- Genus: Synchroa; Newman, 1838

= Synchroa =

Genus of beetles

Synchroa is a genus of synchroa bark beetles in the family Synchroidae. There are about six described species in Synchroa.

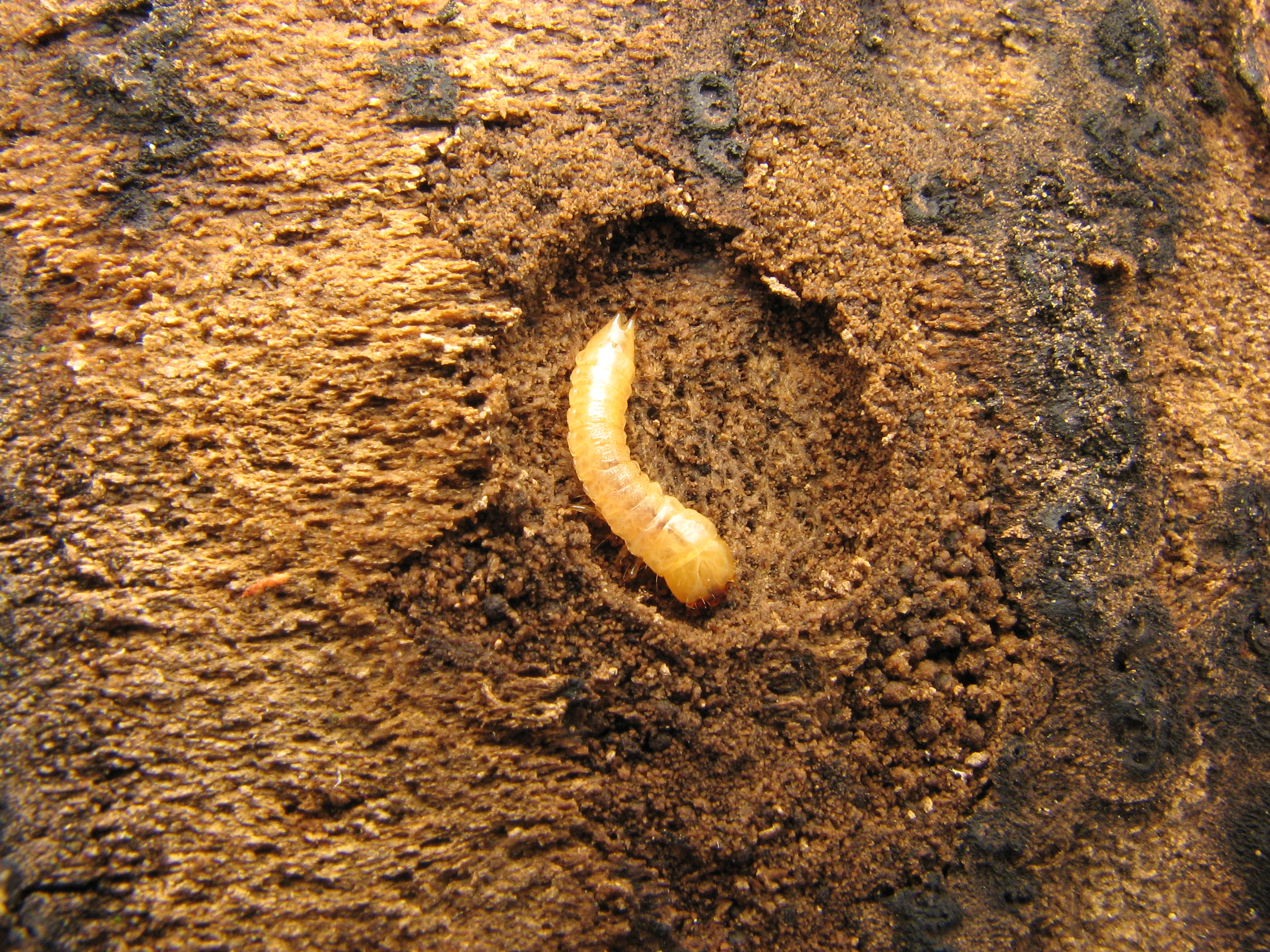
Synchroa punctata larva under bark

== Species ==
These six species belong to the genus Synchroa:

- Synchroa chinensis Nikitsky, 1999^{g}
- Synchroa elongatula Nikitsky, 1999^{g}
- Synchroa melanotoides Lewis, 1895^{g}
- Synchroa punctata Newman, 1838^{i c g b}
- Synchroa quiescens Wickham, 1911^{g}
- Synchroina tenuipennis Fairmaire, 1898^{g}

Data sources: i=ITIS, c=Catalogue of Life, g=GBIF, b=Bugguide.net
