= Hyporhagus =

Scientific classification
- Kingdom: Animalia
- Phylum: Arthropoda
- Clade: Pancrustacea
- Class: Insecta
- Order: Coleoptera
- Suborder: Polyphaga
- Infraorder: Cucujiformia
- Family: Zopheridae
- Subfamily: Zopherinae
- Genus: Hyporhagus; Thomson, 1860

Genus of beetles

Hyporhagus is a genus of opossum beetles in the family Zopheridae. There are about 6 described species in Hyporhagus.

Overall, they look less like "typical" opossum beetles than certain pleasing fungus beetles (family Erotylidae), which belong to another branch of Cucujiformia however. The presumed pleasing fungus beetles of genus Mycotretus and Tritoma collected by J.A.Ramos on Isla de Mona near Puerto Rico in the early 20th century turned out to be Hyporhagus.

== Species ==
- Hyporhagus gilensis Horn, 1872
- Hyporhagus leechi Freude, 1955
- Hyporhagus opaculus LeConte, 1866
- Hyporhagus pseudogilensis Freude, 1955
- Hyporhagus punctulatus Thomson, 1860
- Hyporhagus valdepunctatus Thomson, 1860
