= Mallodrya =

Scientific classification
- Domain: Eukaryota
- Kingdom: Animalia
- Phylum: Arthropoda
- Class: Insecta
- Order: Coleoptera
- Suborder: Polyphaga
- Infraorder: Cucujiformia
- Family: Synchroidae
- Genus: Mallodrya; Horn, 1888
- Species: M. subaenea

Binomial name
- Mallodrya subaenea Horn, 1888

Genus of beetles

Mallodrya is a genus of synchroa bark beetles in the family Synchroidae. There is one described species in Mallodrya, M. subaenea.
