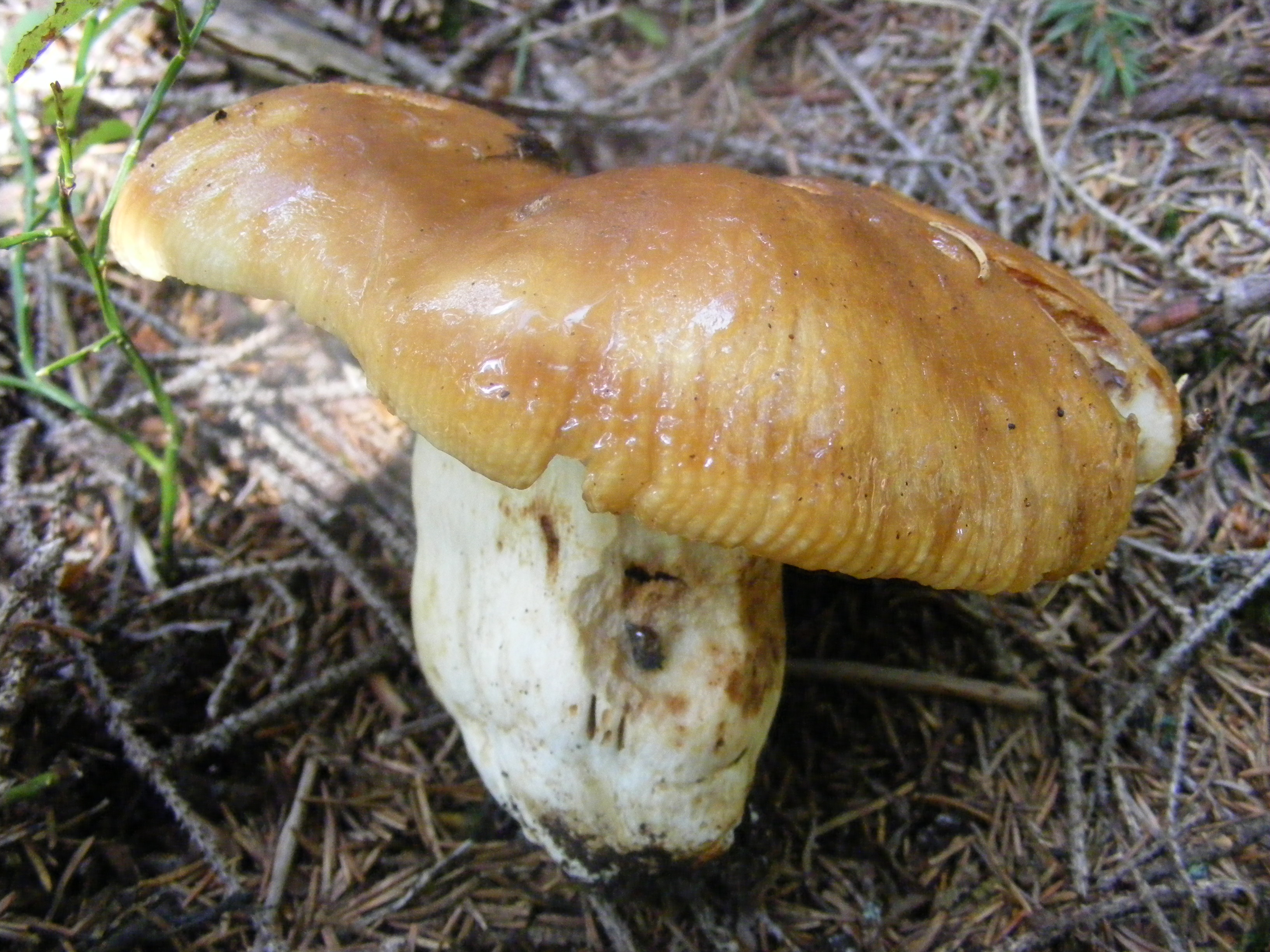

Scientific classification
- Kingdom: Fungi
- Division: Basidiomycota
- Class: Agaricomycetes
- Order: Russulales
- Family: Russulaceae
- Genus: Russula
- Species: R. foetens

Binomial name
- Russula foetens Pers. 1796

= Russula foetens =

Species of fungus

Russula foetens, commonly known as the stinking russula, is a common Russula mushroom found in deciduous and coniferous forests.

Adults of the pleasing fungus beetle Tritoma angulata have been recorded from this fungus, but it does not seem to be a regular food source for them.

== Description ==
The cap is hemispherical and very slimy when young, soon convex, honey yellow to ochre brown and up to 10 cm (4 in) in diameter. The gills and spores are pale cream. The strong stem is white or blotchy yellowish brown. The flesh has a strong acrid smell, when old it has a fishy smell and bad taste.

== Edibility ==
Stinking russula is widely considered inedible. In countries like Russia it is used for traditional mushroom pickles after being soaked in water for several days to remove the strong taste, as with all other Russula species. Such preservation method allows the use of many otherwise inedible russulas and milk-caps in savoury pickles, which are considered a delicacy in Eastern Europe and Scandinavia.

== See also ==
- List of Russula species
