= Russula albida =

Scientific classification
- Domain: Eukaryota
- Kingdom: Fungi
- Division: Basidiomycota
- Class: Agaricomycetes
- Order: Russulales
- Family: Russulaceae
- Genus: Russula
- Species: R. albida

Binomial name
- Russula albida Peck

Species of fungus

Russula albida is a species of fungus said to be edible. It is found in North America under deciduous trees.
