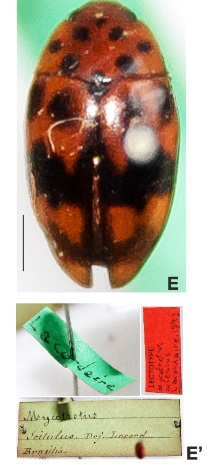

Scientific classification
- Kingdom: Animalia
- Phylum: Arthropoda
- Clade: Pancrustacea
- Class: Insecta
- Order: Coleoptera
- Suborder: Polyphaga
- Infraorder: Cucujiformia
- Family: Erotylidae
- Genus: Mycotretus
- Species: M. scitulus

Binomial name
- Mycotretus scitulus Lacordaire, 1842

Synonyms
- Mycotretus derasofasciatus Kuhnt, 1910; Mycotretus nubifer Casey, 1916

= Mycotretus scitulus =

Species of beetle

Mycotretus scitulus is a species of beetle of the Erotylidae family. This species is found in Guatemala, Venezuela, Mexico and Brazil.

In addition, there is material of this species (both under its valid name and its junior synonym M.derasofasciatus) from Peru, e.g. in the SEMC.
