= Jean Théodore Lacordaire =

Belgian entomologist (1801–1870)

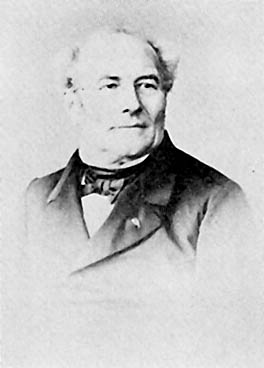
- Born: 1 February 1801; Recey-sur-Ource, Côte-d'Or, France
- Died: 18 July 1870 (aged 69); Liège, Belgium
- Scientific career
- Fields: Entomology
- Institutions: Société Entomologique de France; Royal Swedish Academy of Sciences

Jean Théodore Lacordaire (French: [lakɔʁdɛʁ]; 1 February 1801 – 18 July 1870) was a Belgian entomologist of French extraction.

== Biography ==
In spite of his obvious interest in natural history, Lacordaire's family sent him to Le Havre to study "le droit", or the law. In 1824, he embarked for Buenos Aires where he became a commercial salesman. He traveled widely in South America using every opportunity to carry out many observations on local fauna.

Georges Cuvier suggested he come to Paris in 1830. There he met Pierre André Latreille, Jean Victoire Audouin, and André Marie Constant Duméril and took part in the foundation of the Société Entomologique de France. He went to Guyana at the end of 1830 to collect natural history specimens, returning to France in 1832. In 1835, he became professor of zoology at the University of Liège where he succeeded Henri-Maurice Gaède (1795–1834). In 1837, he became also professor of comparative anatomy. He occupied himself actively with the collections of zoology of the natural history museum of the university from his nomination and greatly enriched it. On his death, the natural history museum included a collection of 12,000 species, with beautiful series of ornithology and ichthyology. From 1834 to 1838, he published Introduction à l'entomologie, comprenant les principes généraux de l'anatomie et de la physiologie des insectes, (Introduction to entomology, including the general principles of the anatomy and the physiology of the insects) in three volumes. In 1835, he published Faune entomologique des environs de Paris (Entomological fauna of the district surrounding of Paris). But his best work is Histoire naturelle des insectes, ″Genera″ des Coléoptères (1854–1876), an immense work of 13 volumes which his death brought to a close. This work was eventually finished by Félicien Chapuis.

Lacordaire was elected to the American Philosophical Society in 1856. In 1868, he was elected a foreign member of the Royal Swedish Academy of Sciences.

One of his three brothers, Jean-Baptiste Henri Lacordaire, was a Dominican priest and an important liberal Catholic polemicist.
