= Mentum =

Anatomical structure near the mouth

The term mentum can refer to several anatomical structures near the mouth of an animal:

- The median plate of an insect's labium.
- The protruding part of the human chin.
- A certain thin projection of the soft parts of the animal, below the mouth, in the family Pyramidellidae.
