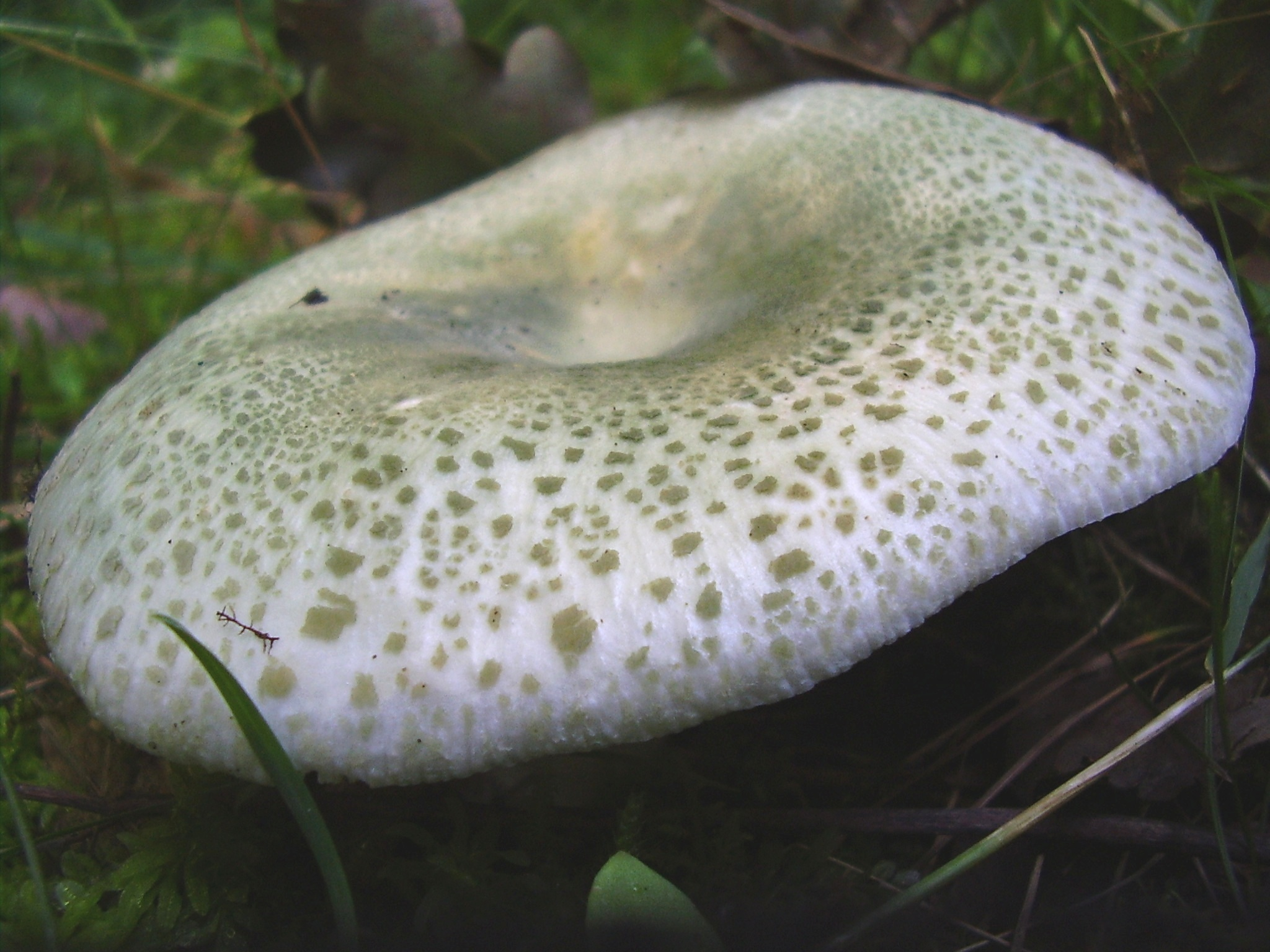

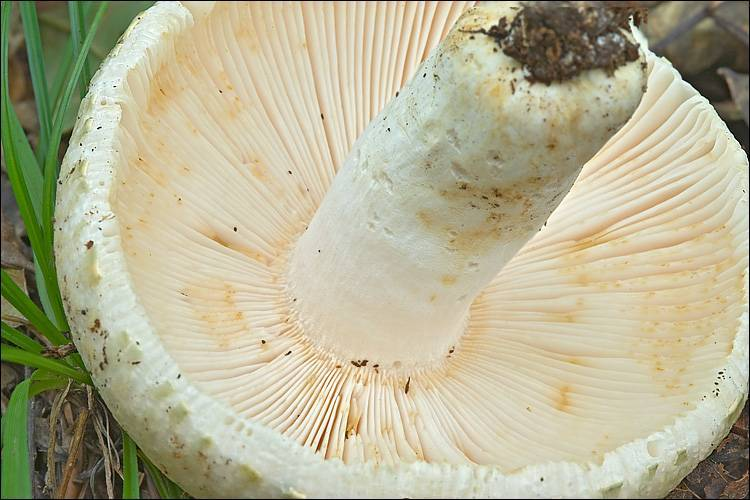

Scientific classification
- Kingdom: Fungi
- Division: Basidiomycota
- Class: Agaricomycetes
- Order: Russulales
- Family: Russulaceae
- Genus: Russula
- Species: R. virescens

Binomial name
- Russula virescens (Schaeff.) Fr. (1836)

Synonyms
- Agaricus virescens Schaeff. (1774); Russula furcata var. aeruginosa Pers. (1796); Agaricus caseosus Wallr. (1883); Russula virescens var. albidocitrina Gillet (1876)

= Russula virescens =

Species of edible fungus

Russula virescens
- Mycological characteristics
- Gills on hymenium
- Cap is convex or flat
- Hymenium is adnate
- Stipe is bare
- Spore print is white to yellow
- Ecology is mycorrhizal
- Edibility is choice

Russula virescens is a basidiomycete mushroom of the genus Russula, and is commonly known as the green-cracking russula, the quilted green russula, or "green brittlegill" (which usually refers to Russula aeruginea). The species was described as new to science in 1774 by Jacob Christian Schaeffer. It can be recognized by its distinctive pale green cap that measures up to 15 cm (6 in) in diameter, the surface of which is covered with darker green angular patches. It has crowded white gills, and a firm, white stipe that is up to 8 cm (3 in) tall and 4 cm (1.6 in) thick. It resembles species such as Russula parvovirescens and R. crustosa.

Its distribution encompasses Eurasia, North Africa, and possibly Central America. It fruits singly or scattered on the ground in both deciduous and mixed forests, forming mycorrhizal associations with broadleaf trees such as oak, European beech, and aspen. In Asia, it associates with several species of tropical lowland rainforest trees of the family Dipterocarpaceae.

Considered to be one of the best edible mushrooms of its genus, it is especially popular in Spain and China. With a taste that is described variously as mild, nutty, fruity, or sweet, it is cooked by grilling, frying, sautéeing, or eaten raw. The mushrooms are rich in carbohydrates and proteins, with a low fat content. R. virescens has a ribonuclease enzyme with a biochemistry unique among edible mushrooms. It also has biologically active polysaccharides, and a laccase enzyme that can break down several dyes used in the laboratory and in the textile industry.

== Taxonomy ==
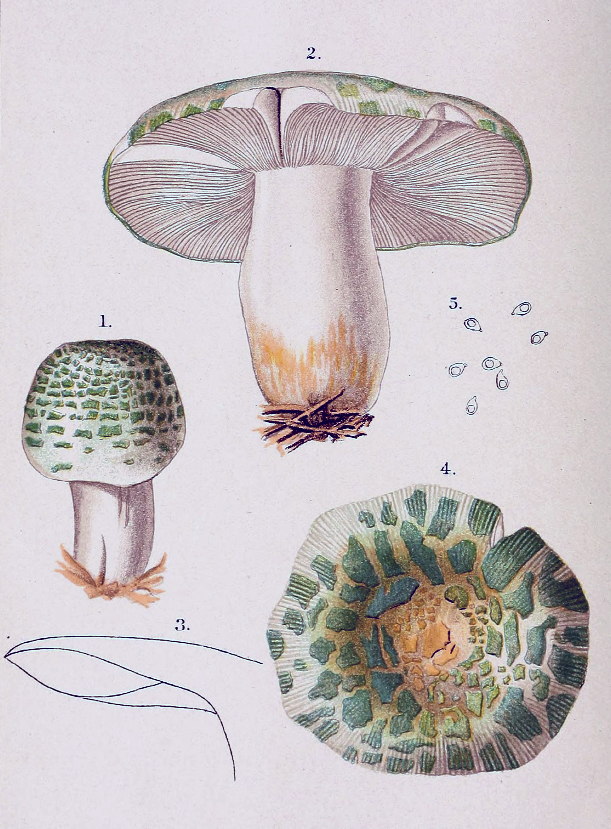
1898 illustration by Louis Charles Christopher Krieger

Russula virescens was first described by German polymath Jacob Christian Schaeffer in 1774 as Agaricus virescens. The species was subsequently transferred to the genus Russula by Elias Fries in 1836. According to the nomenclatural authority MycoBank, Russula furcata var. aeruginosa (published by Christian Hendrik Persoon in 1796) and Agaricus caseosus (published by Karl Friedrich Wilhelm Wallroth in 1883) are synonyms of Russula virescens. The variety albidocitrina, defined by Claude Casimir Gillet in 1876, is no longer considered to have independent taxonomic significance. According to Rolf Singer's 1986 classification of Russula, R. virescens is the type species of subsection Virescentinae in section Rigidae, a grouping of mushrooms characterized by a cap surface that breaks into patches of bran-like (furfuraceous) particles. In a molecular phylogenetic analysis of European Russula, R. virescens formed a clade with R. mustelina; these two species were sister to a clade containing R. amoenicolor and R. violeipes.

The specific epithet virescens is Latin for "becoming green". The characteristic pattern of the cap surface has earned the species common names such as the green-cracking russula, the quilted green russula, and the green brittlegill. In the mid-Atlantic United States, it is also known locally as the moldy russula.

== Description ==
Described by mushroom enthusiast Antonio Carluccio as "not exactly nice to look at", the cap is at first dome or barrel-shaped, becoming convex and flattened with age with a diameter of up to 15 cm (6 in). The cap center is often depressed. The cuticle of the cap is green, most profoundly in the center, with patches of the same color dispersed radially around the center in an areolate pattern. The color of the cuticle is often of variable shade, ranging from gray to verdigris to grass-green. The extent of the patching of the cuticle is also variable, giving specimens with limited patches a resemblance to other green-capped species of Russula, such as R. aeruginea. The green patches of the cap lie on a white to pale green background. The cap, while frequently round, may also exhibit irregular lobes and cracks. The cap cuticle is thin, and can be readily peeled off the surface to a distance of about halfway towards the cap center. The gills are white to cream colored, and fairly crowded together; they are mostly free from attachment to the stipe. Gills are interconnected at their bases by veins. The stipe is cylindrical, white, and of variable height, up to 8 cm (3 in) tall and 4 cm (1.6 in) wide; it is roughly the same thickness at both the top and the base. The top portion of the stipe may be farinose—covered with a white, mealy powder. It may turn slightly brown with age, or when it is injured or bruised from handling. Like other mushrooms in the Russulales, the flesh is brittle, owing to the sphaerocyst cytoarchitecture—cylindrical cells that contrast with the typical fibrous, filamentous hyphae present in other orders of the basidiomycota.

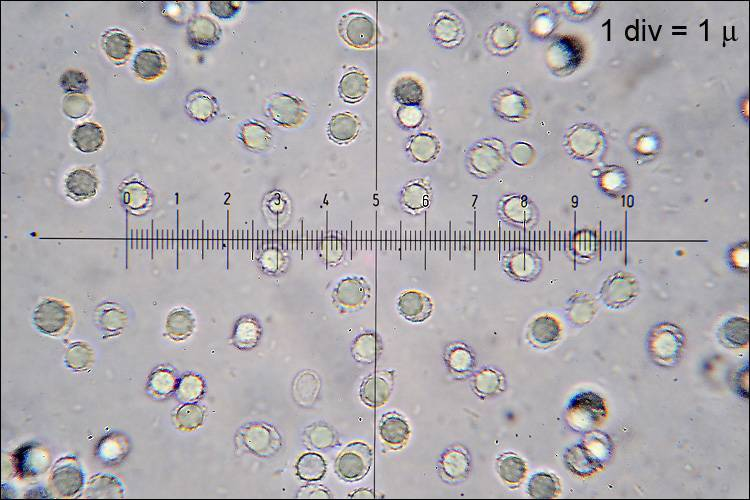
Spores are translucent and warted.

The spores of R. virescens are elliptical or ellipsoid with warts, translucent (hyaline), and produce a white, pale or pale yellow spore print; the spore dimensions are 6–9 by 5–7 μm. A partial reticulum (net-like pattern of ridges) interconnects the warts. The spore-bearing cells, the basidia, are club-shaped and have dimensions of 24–33 by 6–7.5 μm; they are colorless, and each hold from two to four spores. The pleurocystidia (cystidia on the gill face) are 40–85 by 6–8 μm and end abruptly in a sharp point.

=== Similar species ===
Young specimens are pale and can be hard to identify, but the characteristic pattern of older fruit bodies makes them hard to confuse with other species. When collecting R. virescens for consumption, caution is of vital importance to avoid confusion with the dangerously poisonous Amanita phalloides (the death cap), a mushroom that can be most easily identified by its volva and ring.

Russula parvovirescens, found in the eastern United States, can be distinguished from R. virescens by its smaller stature, with caps measuring 4–8 cm (1.6–3.1 in) wide and stipe up to 6 cm (2.4 in) long by 2 cm (0.8 in) thick. Compared to R. virescens, it tends to be more bluish-green, the patches on its cap are larger, and it has a lined cap margin. Microscopically, the terminal cells in the cap cuticle of R. parvovirescens are more swollen than those of R. virescens, which has tapered and elongated terminal cells. Another green-capped Russula is R. aeruginea, but this species may be distinguished from R. virescens by its smaller size and smooth cap. Other green russulas with a smooth cap include R. heterophylla and R. cyanoxantha var. peltereaui. Russula crustosa, like R. virescens, also has an areolate cap, but the cap becomes sticky (viscid) when moist, and its color is more variable, as it may be reddish, yellowish, or brown. Also, the spore print of R. crustosa is a darker yellow than R. virescens. R. redolens has a cap that is "drab-green to blue-green", but unlike R. virescens, is smooth. R. redolens has an unpleasant taste and smells of parsley.

== Distribution and ecology ==
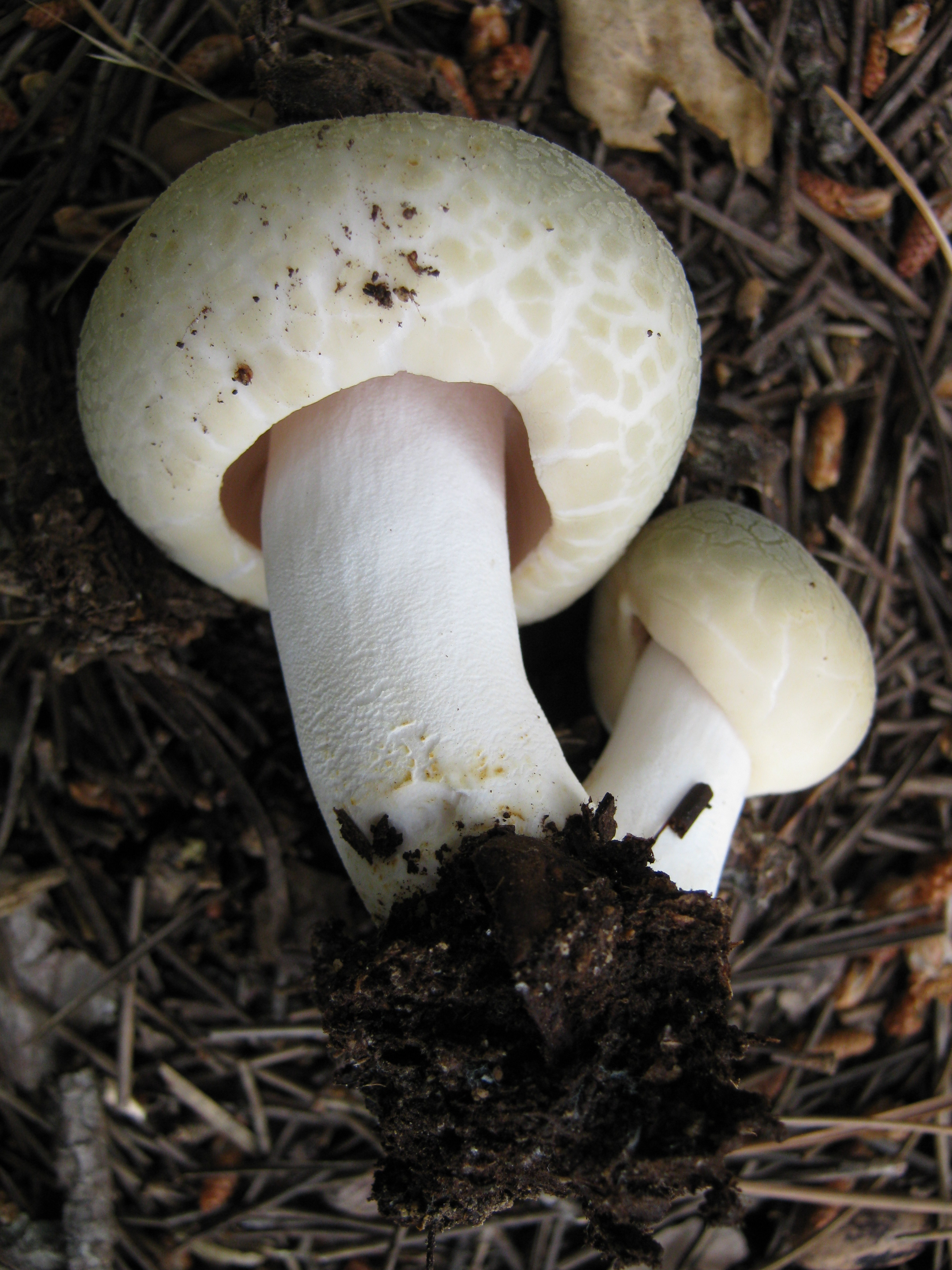
Young mushrooms with light green coloration

The distribution of R. virescens in North America is subject to debate, where a number of similar species such as R. parvovirescens and R. crustosa are also recognized. One author even suggests that R. virescens "is strictly a European species", citing Buyck and collaborators (2006), who say "the virescens-crustosa group is much more complex than suspected and embraces at least a dozen taxa in the eastern US". As in Europe, Russula virescens has a widespread distribution in Asia, having been recorded from India, Malaysia, Korea, the Philippines, Nepal, China, Thailand, and Vietnam. It is also found in North Africa and Central America.

Russula virescens can be found fruiting on soil in both deciduous forests and mixed forests, forming ectomycorrhizal symbiotic relationships with a variety of trees, including oaks (Quercus), European beech (Fagus sylvatica), and aspen (Populus tremula). Preliminary investigations suggest that the fungus also associates with at least ten species of Dipterocarpaceae, an important tree family prevalent in the tropical lowland forests of Southeast Asia. Fruit bodies may appear singly or in groups, reappear in the same spots year after year, and are not common. In Europe, fruiting occurs mainly during the months of summer to early autumn. A Mexican study of the seasonal occurrence of several common mushroom species in subtropical forests in Xalapa showed that the fruiting period of R. virescens occurred in April, before the onset of the rainy season.

This species (or a North American relative, if these are as distinct) has once been recorded as food of the pleasing fungus beetle Aprotritoma pulchra; no other such observation was known as of 1999, and the record is more likely a mix-up with the related Tritoma mimetica, which can indeed be found on Russula species.

== Edibility ==
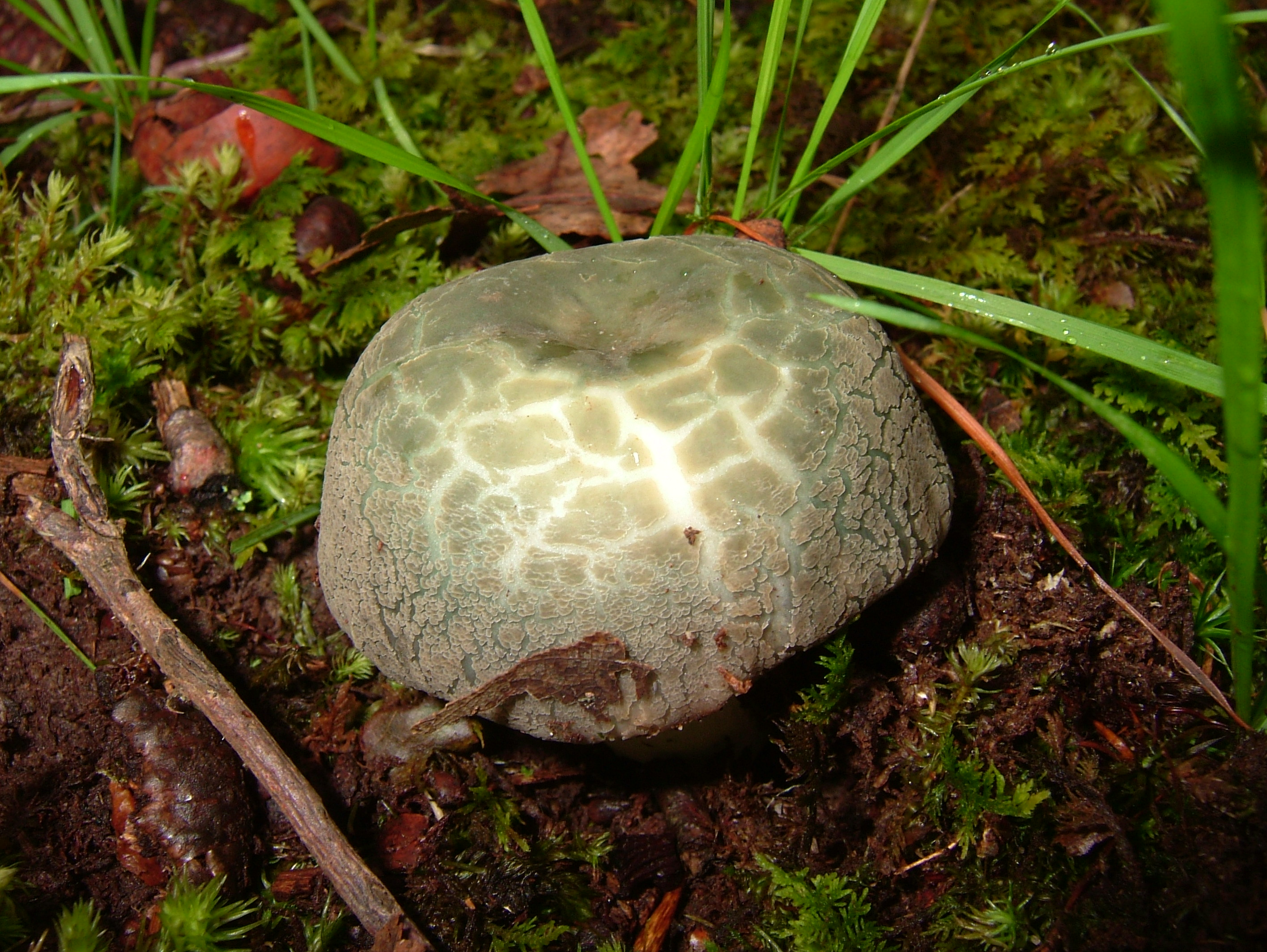
Despite its "moldy" appearance, R. virescens is a good edible mushroom.

Although care must be taken to distinguish from the death cap, R. virescens is an edible mushroom considered to be one of the best of its genus. Its smell is not distinctive, but its taste has been described as mild, nutty, fruity, or even sweet. Old specimens may smell of herrings. Drying the mushrooms enhances the nutty flavor and the green color disappears with cooking. Mushrooms can be sautéed; young specimens prepared this way have a potato taste that pairs well with shallots. They are also fried or grilled, and can be used raw in salads.

It is popular in Europe, particularly in Spain. In an 1875 work on the uses of fungi, English mycologist Mordecai Cubitt Cooke remarked about the mushroom that "the peasants about Milan are in the habit of putting [it] over wood embers to toast, and eating [it] afterwards with a little salt." The mushroom is often sold as a dried product in Asia; in China, it can be found in roadside markets, and used in traditional herbal medicines.

A lady amateur mycophagist of the writer's acquaintance, ... who is especially fond of the green Russula, is never at a loss for this especially prized tidbit as a reward for her daily stroll among the trees. A visitor may often see upon her buffet a small glass dish filled with the mushrooms, nicely scraped and cut in pieces—an ever-present relish between meals. For even in their natural state, as she discriminatingly says, they are "as sweet as chestnuts". This is especially the case with the "buttons" or younger specimens.

— William Hamilton Gibson, Our Edible Toadstools and Mushrooms and How to Distinguish Them (1895)

The nutritional components of R. virescens mushrooms have been characterized. Fresh mushrooms contain about 92.5% moisture. A 100-gram (3.5 oz) sample of dried mushroom (100 g dw) has 365 kcal (1527 kilojoules). Carbohydrates make up the bulk of the fruit bodies, comprising 62% of the dry weight; 11.1% of the carbohydrates are sugars, the large majority of which (10.9%) is mannitol. The total lipid, or crude fat, content makes up 1.85% of the dry matter of the mushroom. The proportion of fatty acids (expressed as a percentage of total fatty acids) are 28.78% saturated, 41.51% monounsaturated, and 29.71% polyunsaturated. The most prevalent fatty acids include: palmitic acid, 17.3% of total fatty acids; stearic acid, 7.16%; oleic acid, 40.27%; and linoleic acid, 29.18%. Several bioactive compounds are present in the mushroom. One hundred grams (dry weight) contains 49.3 micrograms (μg) of tocopherols (20.0 μg alpha, 21.3 μg beta, and 8.0 μg gamma) and 0.19 milligrams (mg) of the carotenoid pigment lycopene. There are 4.46 g of organic acids per 100 g of dry mushrooms, including oxalic acid (0.78 g), malic acid (2.71 g), citric acid (0.55 g), and fumaric acid (0.23 g). Mushrooms have 22.6 mg/100 g dw of the phenolic compound 4-hydroxybenzoic acid, and 15.8 mg/100 g dw of cinnamic acid.

== Chemistry ==
Russula virescens has a limited capacity to bioaccumulate the micronutrients iron, copper, and zinc from the soil. The concentration of these trace metals is slightly higher in the caps than the stipes. A 300-gram (11 oz) meal of fresh mushroom caps would supply 16% of the recommended daily allowance (RDA) of copper for an adult male or female (ages 19–50); 16% or 7.3% of the RDA of iron for an adult male or female, respectively; and 16–22% of the adult RDA of zinc. The mushroom is a poor bioaccumulator of the toxic heavy metals arsenic, cadmium, lead, mercury, and nickel.

Biologically active mushroom polysaccharides have been a frequent research topic in recent decades due to their possible stimulatory effect on innate and cell-mediated immune responses, antitumor activities, and other activities. Immunostimulatory activity, antioxidant activity, cholesterol-lowering, and blood sugar-lowering effects have been detected in extracts of R. virescens fruit bodies, which are attributed to polysaccharides. A water-insoluble beta-glucan, RVS3-II, has been isolated from the fruit bodies. Sulfated derivatives of this compound have antitumor activities against sarcoma tumor cell lines. RVP, a water-soluble polysaccharide present in the mushroom, is made largely of galactomannan subunits and has antioxidant activity.

Ribonucleases (or RNases) are enzymes that catalyze the hydrolysis of ribonucleic acid (RNA), and collectively they play a critical role in many biological processes. A RNase from R. virescens was shown to be biochemically unique amongst seven edible mushroom species in several ways: it has a co-specificity towards cleaving RNA at poly A and poly C, compared to the monospecific RNases of the others; it can be adsorbed on chromatography columns containing DEAE–cellulose as the adsorbent; it has a pH optimum of 4.5, lower than all other species; and, it has a "distinctly different" N-terminal amino acid sequence. The mushroom contains a unique laccase enzyme that can break down several dyes used in the laboratory and in the textile industry, such as bromothymol blue, eriochrome black T, malachite green, and reactive brilliant blue. Laccases are being used increasingly in the textile industry as environmental biocatalysts for the treatment of dye wastewater.

== See also ==
- List of Russula species
