= Aporotritoma pulchra =

Scientific classification
- Kingdom: Animalia
- Phylum: Arthropoda
- Clade: Pancrustacea
- Class: Insecta
- Order: Coleoptera
- Suborder: Polyphaga
- Infraorder: Cucujiformia
- Family: Erotylidae
- Genus: Aporotritoma
- Species: A. pulchra

Binomial name
- Aporotritoma pulchra (Say, 1826)

Synonyms
- Mycotretus pulcher (Say, 1826); Mycotretus pulchra (lapsus); Tritoma basale Melsheimer, 1847; Tritoma cincta Lacordaire, 1842; Tritoma dimidiata Lacordaire, 1842; Tritoma pulchra Say, 1826; Tritoma sellata Kuhnt, 1910

Species of beetle

Aporotritoma pulchra, the handsome tritoma, is a small North American species of pleasing fungus beetle (family Erotylidae). It belongs to subfamily Tritominae, or – in taxonomic arrangements that prefer a more comprehensive subfamily Erotylinae – in tribe Tritomini of the Erotylinae.

Traditionally, this species was placed in genus Tritoma; whether its move to the otherwise Asian genus Aporotritoma – formerly a subgenus of Tritoma – is indeed correct remains to be determined.

== Taxonomy ==
Aporotritoma pulchra was described by Thomas Say in 1826 under the name Tritoma pulchrum. However, the type specimen Say used in his description is unknown, and it may have been destroyed by pests. The species name came into secondary homonymy in 1926, when the genus Pseudotritoma was synonymized under Tritoma. This change caused the species Pseudotritoma pulchra and Aporotritoma pulchra to both be named Tritoma pulchra until Pseudotritoma was reinstated in 1990. In 2021, Tritoma pulchra was moved to Aporotritoma based on the prosternal lines forming a distinct triangular plate.

== Description ==
The handsome tritoma is a tiny beetle, about 2.6-4.2 mm long and 1.5-2.5 mm wide as adults, approximately drop-shaped, with a wide body, pointed wingtips, a blunt head, and a strongly glossy surface. The elytra bear lengthwise lines of small punctures. A.pulchra are mostly black, with a large orange-red heart-shaped mark on the forward half of the elytra which leaves the scutellum black. The "clubs" of the antennae are dark chestnut brown; the antenna "stalks" and the palps are orange-red. The elytral spot is individually variable – in some individuals it extends almost to the wingtips, in some others it is reduced to the "shoulders" of the wing and wider than long, with a plunt rearward tip; some specimens appear darker than usual, because the puncture-lines in the orange-red part of their elytra are blackish. Such variants have described as supposedly news species times and again.

Dark individuals of Tritoma mimetica have a similar coloration on the upperside as large-spotted individuals of A.pulchra, but the legs of the former are always orange to light brown, and the underside is only blackish in the center, shading to brown on the sides. From Tritoma proper, A.pulchra can also be distinguished by a large pentagonal (instead of smaller and triangular) mentum, and a line running along the sharply cut-off epistome tip which is smoothly curved instead of running exactly parallel to the angular edge. Also, the lengthwise lines on the prosternum run all the way from the forward to rear edge, curving inwards in front of the attachment points of the forelegs and meeting at the headward tip of the prosternum to enclose a triangular area; in Tritoma proper these lines only run from the foreleg attachments to the rear edge of the prosternum.

Head
The head has small compound eyes have tiny ommatidia, indicating a diurnal or crepuscular lifestyle, but with overall rather little reliance on eyesight. Its surface is covered with strong and fairly dense-set punctures. Adults possess file-like structures at the sides of the neck attachment, which, when the beetle wiggles its head, rub against the chitin and produce a squeaking sound; the degree of development of these structures is unreliable for distinguishing males and females. The epistome has a straighly cut-off tip with a smoothly curving transverse stripe separating a margin – very thin in the middle and wider towards the antenna insertions – from the bulk of the epistome. The "cheek" lobes below the compound eyes are very large – as long as the compound eyes, and overlapping their inner edges when seen from below –, broad and well-rounded, with the distance between them a bit less at the front than in the back, and visible all around the tip of the maxillary palps when these are in resting position; they resemble the "cheek" lobes of Triplax festiva, but are even larger. The antenna length is less than half of the pronotal base width, with antenna segment 3 almost as long as the segments 4 and 5 together, and a "clubbed" antenna tip which is about half again as long as it is wide.

The galea and lacinia of the maxilla resemble those of the related genus Triplax, except for the lack of teeth at the tip of the lacinia. The maxillary palps have an end segment that is wide and somewhat triangular. It does not seem to carry a brush, but there might be a vestigial brush hidden within a slit at the tip. The labium has a mentum that is large and pentagonal. The labial palps end in a narrow segment with a strong bristle at the outer side and a tiny brush at the tip.

Body, wings and legs
The prothorax is almost as wide at the base as the wings at their widest point. The pronotum is fairly wide and trapezoid-shaped, with the rear edge more than half again as long as the forward edge, and moderately curved sides. It has the same strong punctures as the head very sparsely strewn across the center; towards the sides of the pronotum, the punctures become markedly smaller and slightly more dense. A thin margin runs around the sides and front of the pronotum, but is absent from the rear. There is no dimple in the center of the forward edge of the pronotum, but in each corner there is a small and inconspicuous pore. The prosternum has lengthwise lines along the center margin of the leg attachments extending to the forward edge of the prosternum, sharply curving towards each other in front of the leg attachments, and meeting at the centerline of the forward prosternal edge. This forms a flattened area between the lines, shaped roughly like an equilateral triangle; while such a feature is not found in Tritoma sensu stricto, a similar triangle can be seen on the prosternum of Microsternus ulkei, which belongs to a widely distinct lineage of pleasing fungus beetles.

On the metasternum, the lines between the leg attachments are clearly engraved, and extend to about halfway between the rear edge of the leg attachment and the side of the metasternum. The scutellum is bluntly heart-shaped. The elytra lack a distinct margin at the base, except for a very slim margin in front of the "shoulders".

The attachments of each leg pair are widely separated. The tibiae are barely widened towards the ends; their upper/outer edge is narrowed to a very thin "razor edge" towards the tip. Segment 4 of the tarsi is reduced, and attached to the upper centerside of segment 3.

On the abdomen, coxal lines are present, and the intercoxal process is wide and has a cut-off or slightly rounded tip. Males and females do not have conspicuously different external abdominal structures. The aedeagus of the male genitalia resembles that of some Triplax species more than typical Tritoma. The internal sac protrudes through a hole in the middle foramen and extends tipward of the median lobe for about half the length of the median strut; at the forward end it has a distinctive muscle attachment. The enclosed ejaculatory duct is strongly sclerotized and quite long, extending rearwards to the orifice in the foramen. In the relative proportions of the median lobe and median strut, as well as in having a tooth-shaped lobe at the base of each tegminal arm, the genitalia of A.pulchra are more similar to Tritoma sensu stricto such as T.humeralis or T.mimetica, but these have a more curved median lobe and far shorter tegminal arm "teeth". The tube of the female genitalia is not conspicuously shortened as in typical Tritoma. In the middle of each stylus, there is one very long bristle, a trait shared with the related genus Haematochiton. The seminal receptacle is huge, irregularly shaped, and more similar to that of Ischyrus in having a U-shaped swollen and strongly sclerotized extension.

== Distribution and ecology ==
A.pulchra is found in North America east of the Rocky Mountains. The type specimen, like many beetles collected by Thomas Say, is probably lost; its type locality was not given more precisely than "United States", referring to the U.S. territory around 1820. The species occurs from Nova Scotia and Quebec in Canada and the US New England states to Ontario and Minnesota in the north, and from Georgia and presumably northwestern Florida (it has been recorded in nearby Mobile, Alabama) to Oklahoma and Texas in the south. Westwards, they range to South Dakota, Kansas and southeastern Nebraska. The northern limit is at least Franconia, New Hampshire, Camel's Hump in Vermont, Newport, Olcott and the Forest Lawn neighborhood in Webster (all in upstate New York), Duparquet, Quebec, Kearney and Ottawa in Ontario, and Cape Breton County, Nova Scotia. Among the westernmost records are Itasca State Park in Minnesota, near the Little Blue River between Endicott and Fairbury in Nebraska, and Topeka, Kansas. The southeastern- and southwesternmost extents of its range is very inadequately known.

This beetle is more tolerant of cold than Tritoma sensu stricto. Even at the northeasternmost limit of its range, on Nova Scotia, it is not rare, and may in fact be the most common pleasing fungus beetle found there. It can be encountered almost around the year even far north in its range, with the Forest Lawn record from a February 12th; the Mobile record was from a December 18. In Cheaha State Park in Alabama and Lakehurst, New Jersey, it has been collected in late April, and in New Augusta, Mississippi on a November 19. Most often however it is encountered throughout its range in July and August.

=== Food ===
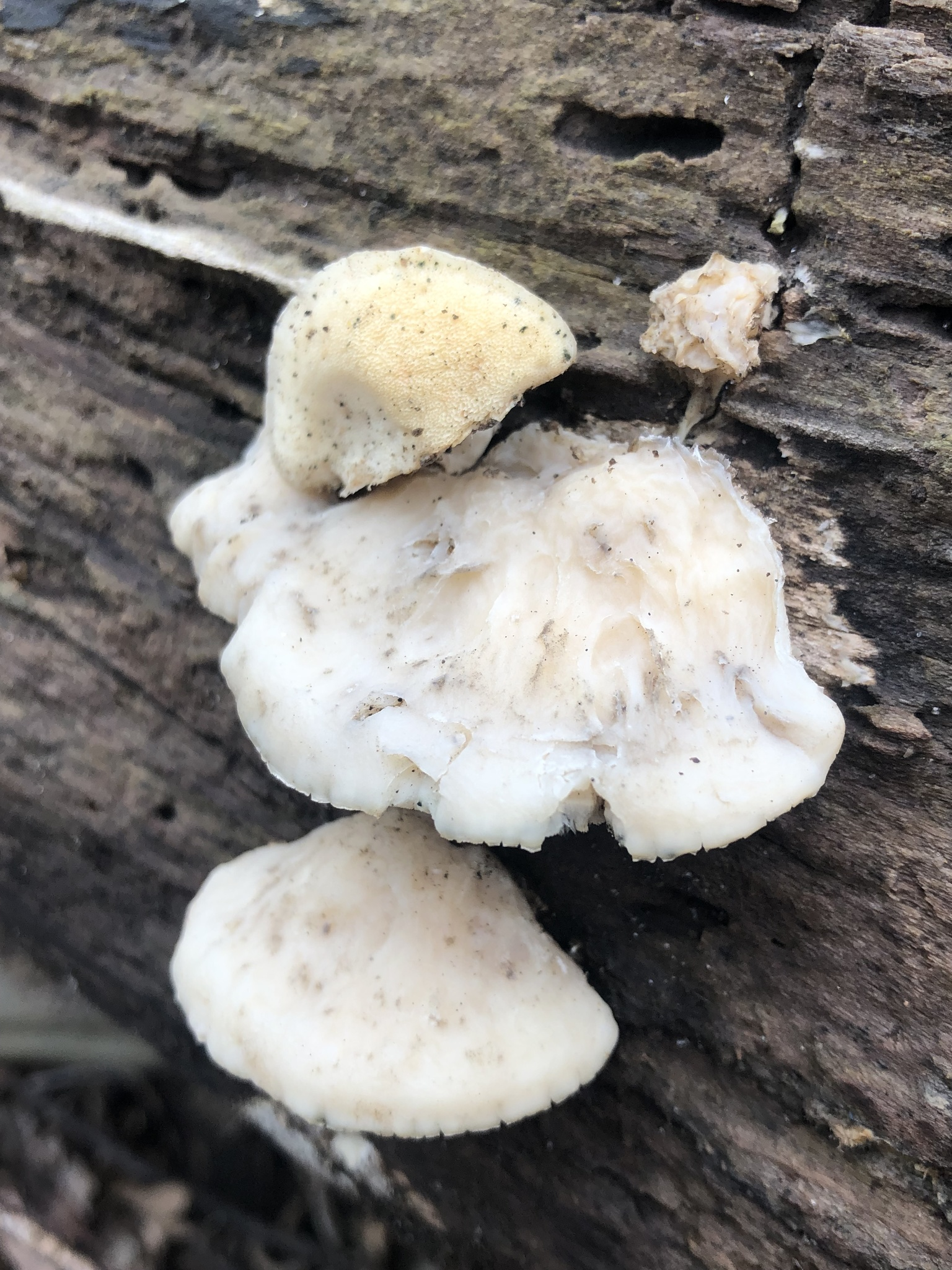
A favorite food of Aporotritoma pulchra: White cheese polypore (Trail 8 at Dunes Creek, Indiana Dunes State Park)

This beetle eats fungi as larva and adults, with a strong preference for polypores (bracket fungi) in order Polyporales. The majority of the recorded hosts belong to the erstwhile genus "Polyporus sensu lato", which is nowadays heavily split up. Most often, the white cheese polypore Tyromyces chioneus of family Incrustoporiaceae and the greyling bracket (Postia tephroleuca) of family Fomitopsidaceae have been recorded as A.pulchra food; a report of numerous adults from a "Ceriporia" (family Irpicaceae) cannot be determined more precisely.

Other fungi associated with A.pulchra are artist's bracket (Ganoderma applanatum, Ganodermataceae), the Fomitopsidaceae Postia floriformis, P.immitis (erroneously determined as the European bitter bracket P.stiptica) and birch bracket (Fomitopsis betulina), and dryad's saddle (Cerioporus squamosus) of family Polyporaceae; the supposed occurrence on Oligoporus (family Dacryobolaceae) probably refers to a Postia species. Once, this beetle was supposedly found on a gilled fungus named as "Russula irrescens", which is probably a lapsus for the green-cracking brittlegill R.virescens (Russulales: Russulaceae) or one of its North American relatives R.crustosa/R.parvovirescens. But this record is more likely a mix-up with Tritoma mimetica, which looks similar to A.pulchra and has a somewhat wider food spectrum: the larvae of A.pulchra are comparatively well-studied, and among thousands of records of this species, only this single one associates it with Russula. Highly unusual for Tritominae (or Tritomini) is a claim of A.pulchra associated with (and presumably feeding on) the myxogastrian slime mold Stemonitis axifera. But none of these occasional records necessarily imply that the beetles were actually feeding on those species rather than simply sheltering there, or that the supposed food item in question was even correctly identified to genus or species.

By Erotylidae standards, this species is comparatively well-studied. As early as 1920, its larvae, pupae and their development were described, and a protocol for breeding it in captivity had been developed.
