= Oligoporus =

Scientific classification
- Kingdom: Fungi
- Division: Basidiomycota
- Class: Agaricomycetes
- Order: Polyporales
- Family: Dacryobolaceae
- Genus: Oligoporus; Bref. (1888)

Type species
- Oligoporus farinosus Bref. (1888)

Genus of fungi

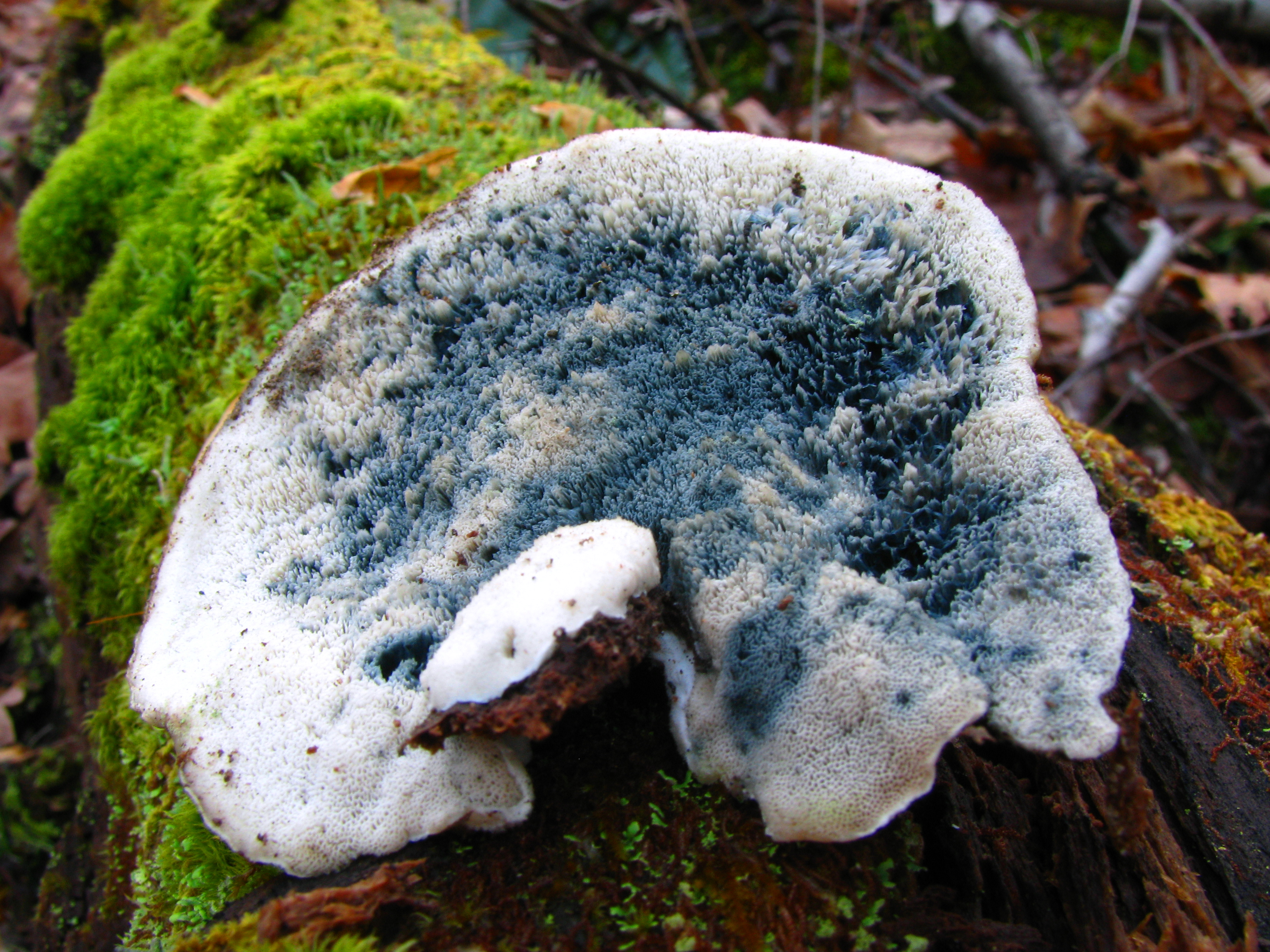

Oligoporus is a genus of fungi in the family Polyporaceae. The genus was circumscribed by German mycologist Julius Oscar Brefeld in 1888 with Oligoporus farinosus as the type. This species is currently known as Postia rennyi. The genus name combines the Ancient Greek words ὀλίγος ("few") and πόρος ("pore").

Oligoporus species have fruit bodies that are either crust-like or pileate (i.e., with a cap). Species cause a brown rot of wood. The hyphal structure is monomytic, meaning that only generative hyphae are produced. Spores made by Oligoporus fungi are ellipsoid or have a short cylindrical shape.

Oligoporus were claimed to be a favored food of the pleasing fungus beetle Aporotritoma pulchra, but the fungi in question apparently all belong to genus Postia of the family Fomitopsidaceae.

== Species ==
A 2008 estimate placed 10 species in Oligoporus; As of June 2018, Index Fungorum accepts 13 species.

- Oligoporus alni (Niemelä & Vampola) Piatek (2003) – Europe
- Oligoporus balsaminus (Niemelä & Y.C.Dai) Niemelä (2005) – Eurasia
- Oligoporus bambusicola (Corner) T.Hatt. (2002)
- Oligoporus cretaceitextus (Corner) T.Hatt. (2002)
- Oligoporus davidiae (M. Pieri & B. Rivoire) Niemelä (2009)
- Oligoporus dissectus (Cooke) Huckfeldt & O.Schmidt (2017)
- Oligoporus friesii Falck & O.Falck (1937)
- Oligoporus hydnoidea G.Gaarder & Ryvarden (2003)
- Oligoporus perplexus (Corner) T.Hatt. (2001)
- Oligoporus persicinus (Niemelä & Y.C.Dai) Niemelä (2005) – Europe
- Oligoporus romellii (M.Pieri & B.Rivoire) Niemelä (2009) – Finland
- Oligoporus subfragilis (Corner) T.Hatt. (2003)
- Oligoporus wakefieldiae (Kotl. & Pouzar) L.Ryvarden & Melo (2014)
