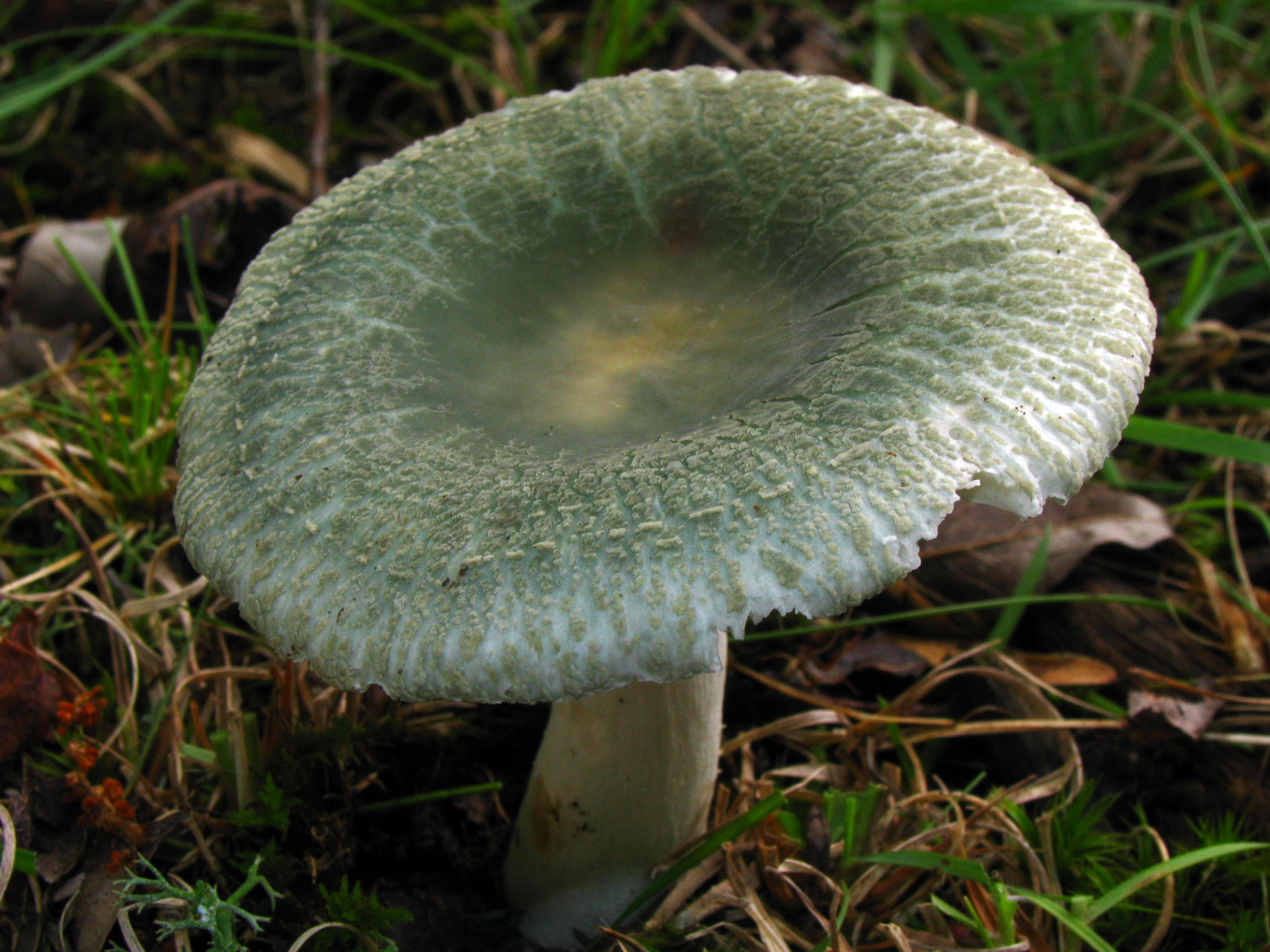

Scientific classification
- Domain: Eukaryota
- Kingdom: Fungi
- Division: Basidiomycota
- Class: Agaricomycetes
- Order: Russulales
- Family: Russulaceae
- Genus: Russula
- Species: R. parvovirescens

Binomial name
- Russula parvovirescens Buyck, D.Mitchell & Parrent (2006)

= Russula parvovirescens =

Species of fungus

Russula parvovirescens is a basidiomycete mushroom of the genus Russula. Found in the eastern United States, it was described as new to science in 2006.

== Description ==
The green cap is convex with a nearly flat top and central depression, and 4–7 centimetres (1 1/2–2 3/4 in) wide; it has a quilted appearance due to cracks that increase near the margin. The stem is 3.5–7 cm (1 1/2–2 3/4 in) long and 8–18 millimetres (3/8–3/4 in) thick. The spore print is cream.

=== Similar species ===
It is similar in appearance to the more widespread Russula virescens and R. crustosa, but can be distinguished from those species by its smaller stature, and microscopically by the voluminous terminal cells of the cap cuticle.

== Distribution and habitat ==
It appears in the eastern United States from June to September.

== See also ==
- List of Russula species
