= Russula mukteshwarica =

Scientific classification
- Domain: Eukaryota
- Kingdom: Fungi
- Division: Basidiomycota
- Class: Agaricomycetes
- Order: Russulales
- Family: Russulaceae
- Genus: Russula
- Species: R. mukteshwarica

Binomial name
- Russula mukteshwarica K.Das, S.L.Mill., J.R.Sharma & R.P.Bhatt (2006)

Species of fungus

Russula mukteshwarica is a mushroom closely related to R. violeipes. It has a purple planoconvex cap 65–130 mm in diameter, and gills that are yellow to yellow-green. The type specimen was collected from a forested region in Uttaranchand State in northern India.

== See also ==
- List of Russula species
