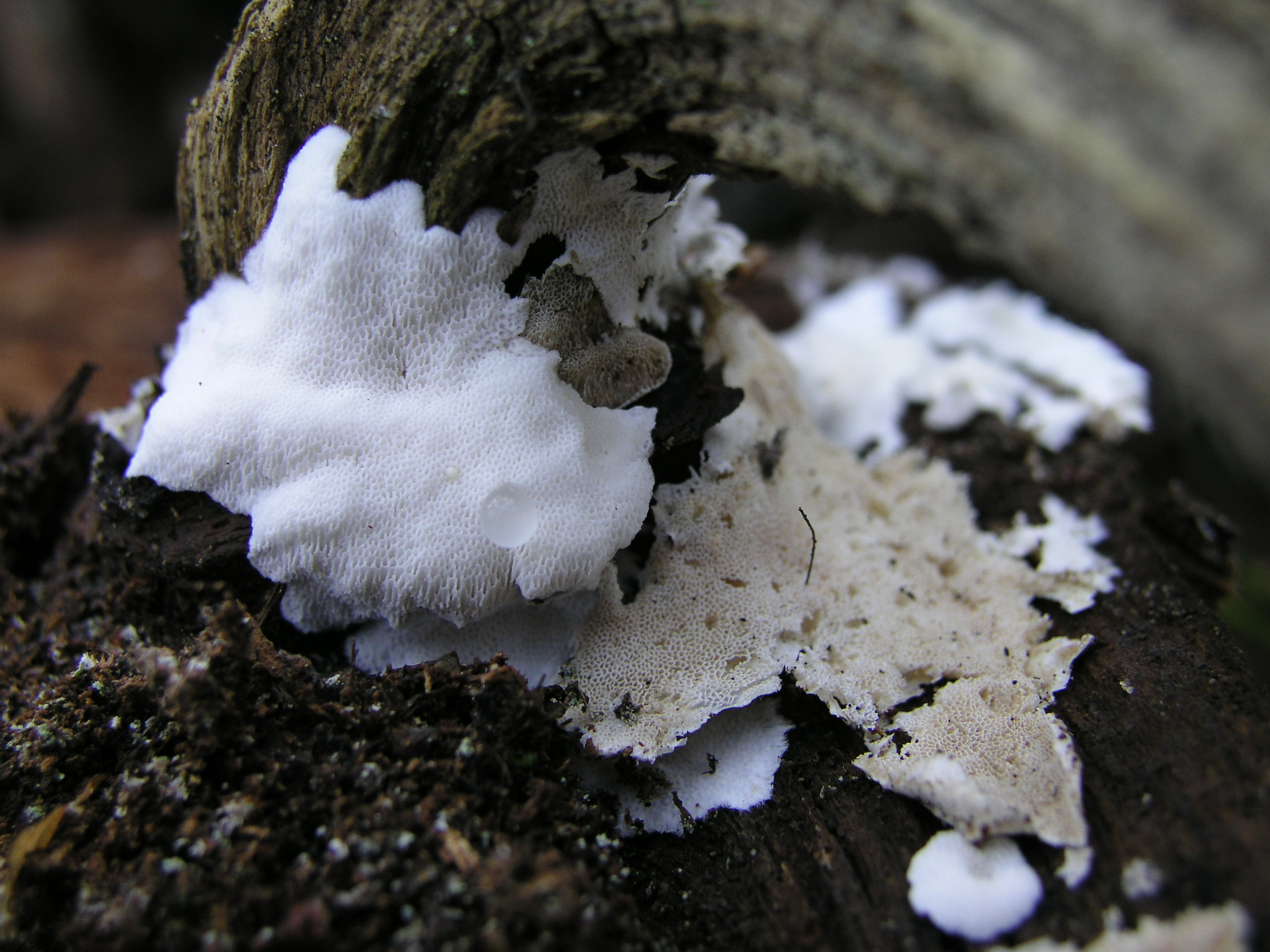

Scientific classification
- Domain: Eukaryota
- Kingdom: Fungi
- Division: Basidiomycota
- Class: Agaricomycetes
- Order: Polyporales
- Family: Fomitopsidaceae
- Genus: Postia
- Species: P. sericeomollis

Binomial name
- Postia sericeomollis (Romell) Jülich, 1982

= Postia sericeomollis =

Species of fungus

Postia sericeomollis is a species of fungus belonging to the family Dacryobolaceae.

Synonym:

- Oligoporus sericeomollis (Romell) Bondartseva, 1983
