= Postia cylindrica =

Scientific classification
- Domain: Eukaryota
- Kingdom: Fungi
- Division: Basidiomycota
- Class: Agaricomycetes
- Order: Polyporales
- Family: Fomitopsidaceae
- Genus: Postia
- Species: P. cylindrica

Binomial name
- Postia cylindrica H.S.Yuan (2017)

Species of fungus

Postia cylindrica is a species of poroid fungus in the family Fomitopsidaceae. Found in Southern China, it was described as a new species in 2017 by Hai-Sheng Yuan. The type collection was found growing on a dead pine tree in Jiangxi. The fungus is characterized macroscopically by crust-like to effused-reflexed fruit bodies with a cream to buff coloured cap surface and a reddish-brown margin that curves inward. There are gloeoplerous (oily) hyphal cells in the cuticular layer, and an absence of cystidia in the hymenium. The fungus produces smooth, cylindrical, thin-walled spores measuring 4.7–5.2 by 1.3–1.5 μm.
