= Microsternus tricolor =

Scientific classification
- Kingdom: Animalia
- Phylum: Arthropoda
- Clade: Pancrustacea
- Class: Insecta
- Order: Coleoptera
- Suborder: Polyphaga
- Infraorder: Cucujiformia
- Family: Erotylidae
- Genus: Microsternus
- Species: M. tricolor

Binomial name
- Microsternus tricolor Lewis, 1887

Synonyms
- Microsternus taiwanicus Nakane, 1966; Microsternum tricolor (lapsus); Microsternus tricolor taiwanicus Nakane, 1966; Microsternus tricolor tricolor Lewis, 1887

Species of beetle

Microsternus tricolor is a species of pleasing fungus beetle (family Erotylidae). In its family, it is placed in tribe Dacnini of subfamily Erotylinae, or in a distinct subfamily Dacninae if the Erotylinae are more narrowly circumscribed. This species is found on Taiwan and in northeastern mainland China, Japan, and the adjacent parts of the Russian Far East.

The species' name comes from Latin tricolor meaning "three-colored".

== Description ==
Microsternus tricolor adults are 3 to 5 mm long and 1.4 to 2.4 mm wide. They have three colors as the scientific name implies: red, light orange, and black. These beetles have a punctured, close pronotum and orange and black bands on the elytra.

The ecology of this beetle is not well known. It was recorded on a hydnoid fungus of genus Hydnochaete, but not observed to feed on it.

== Taxonomy ==
Microsternus tricolor was described by George Lewis in 1887 based on specimens from Japan. An individual from Taiwan with aberrant color pattern was proposed to represent a subspecies Microsternus tricolor taiwanicus by Takehiko Nakane in 1966, with the Japanese and continental populations becoming the nominate subspecies Microsternus tricolor tricolor. Subsequent studies found individuals with similarly variant coloration in Japan, and thus no subspecies are accepted today; instead, the name taiwanicus refers to a mere variety with no nomenclatorial standing. A related beetle from Taiwan is in fact a distinct species; formerly, it was placed in Microsternus with the confusingly similar name M.taiwanus, but more recently it has been moved into genus Neosternus.
