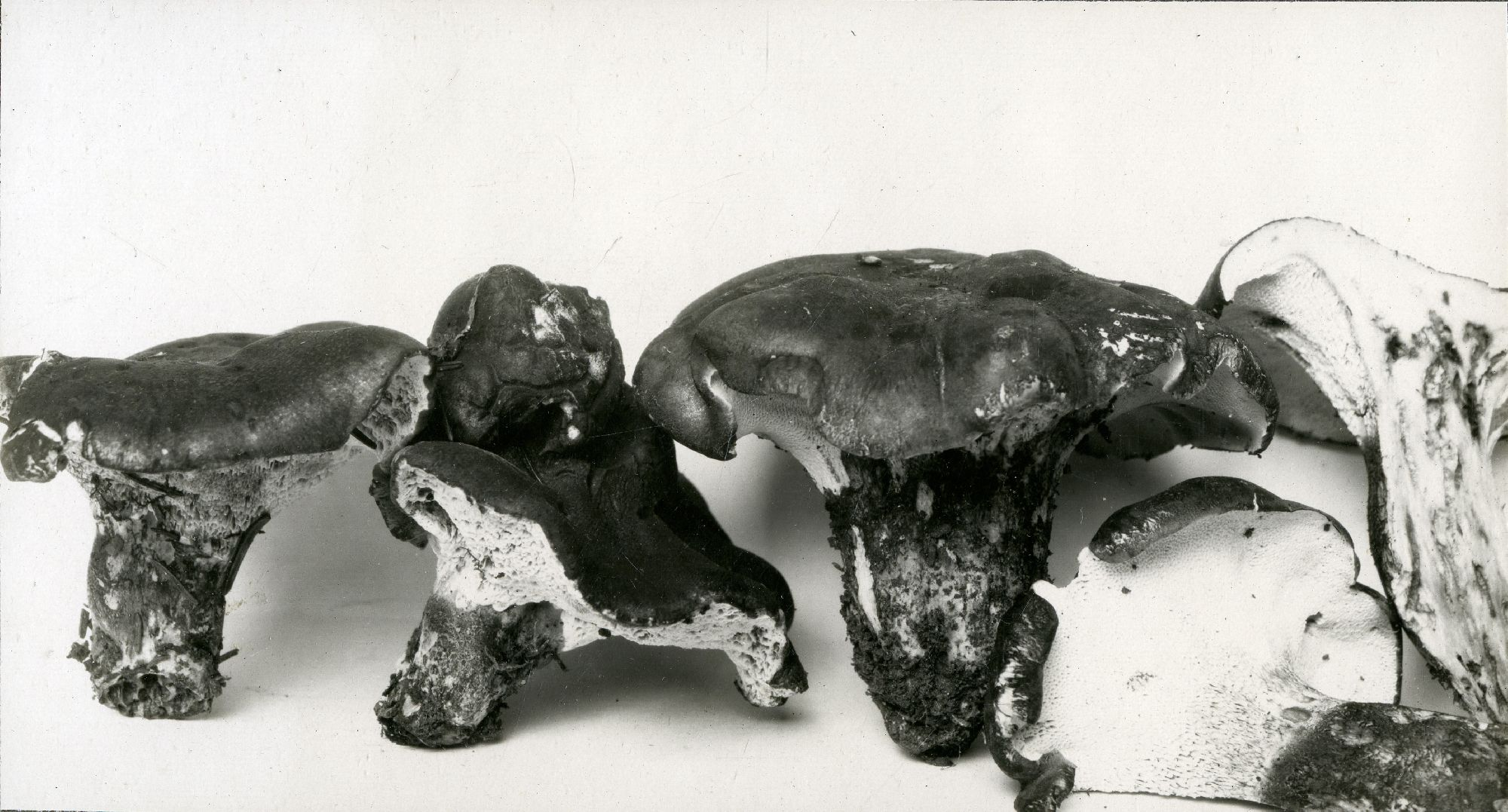

Scientific classification
- Kingdom: Fungi
- Division: Basidiomycota
- Class: Agaricomycetes
- Order: Polyporales
- Family: Fomitopsidaceae
- Genus: Postia
- Species: P. leucomallella

Binomial name
- Postia leucomallella (Murrill) Jülich

= Postia leucomallella =

Species of fungus

Postia leucomallella is a species of fungus belonging to the family Fomitopsidaceae.

It has cosmopolitan distribution.
