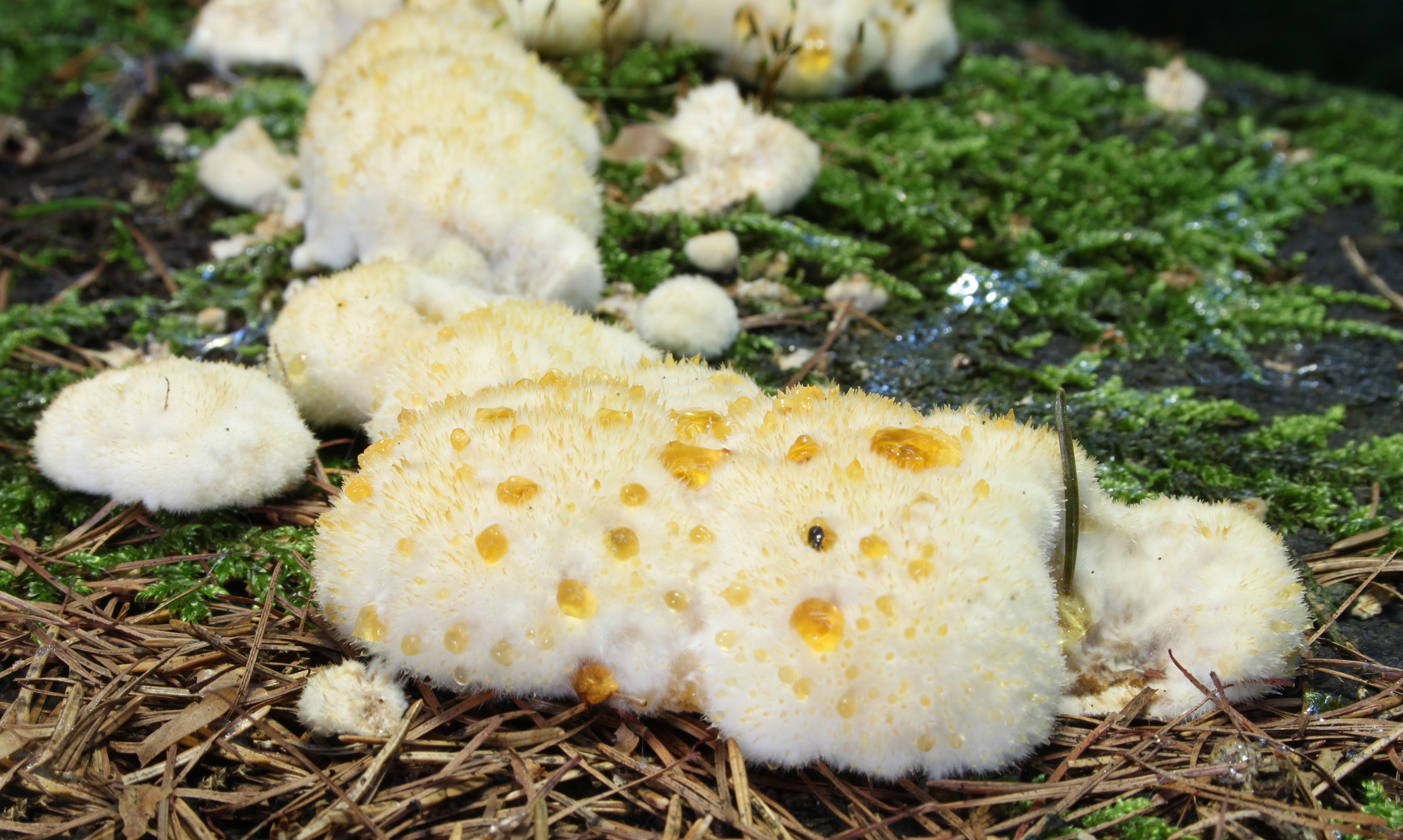

Scientific classification
- Domain: Eukaryota
- Kingdom: Fungi
- Division: Basidiomycota
- Class: Agaricomycetes
- Order: Polyporales
- Family: Fomitopsidaceae
- Genus: Postia
- Species: P. ptychogaster

Binomial name
- Postia ptychogaster (F.Ludw.) Vesterh. (1996)

Synonyms
- Species synonymy: Polyporus ptychogaster F.Ludw. (1880); Tyromyces ptychogaster (F.Ludw.) Donk (1933); Oligoporus ptychogaster (F.Ludw.) Falck & O.Falck (1937); Leptoporus ptychogaster (F.Ludw.) Pilát (1938); Trichoderma fuliginoides Pers. (1801); Arongylium fuliginoides (Pers.) Link (1809); Strongylium fuliginoides (Pers.) Ditmar (1809); Ptychogaster fuliginoides (Pers.) Donk (1972); Ptychogaster albus Corda (1838); Ceriomyces albus var. richonii Sacc. (1888); Ceriomyces albus (Corda) Sacc. (1888); Ceriomyces richonii Sacc. (1888); Oligoporus ustilaginoides Bref. (1889); Polyporus ustilaginoides (Bref.) Sacc. & Traverso (1911); Ptychogaster flavescens Falck & O.Falck (1937)

= Postia ptychogaster =

Species of fungus

Postia ptychogaster, commonly known as the powderpuff bracket, is a species of fungus in the family Fomitopsidaceae. The fungus, which is found in Europe and North America, resembles a powdery cushion that fruits on stumps and logs of rotting conifer wood. In this stage of its life cycle, the "cushion" is a mass of chlamydospores.
