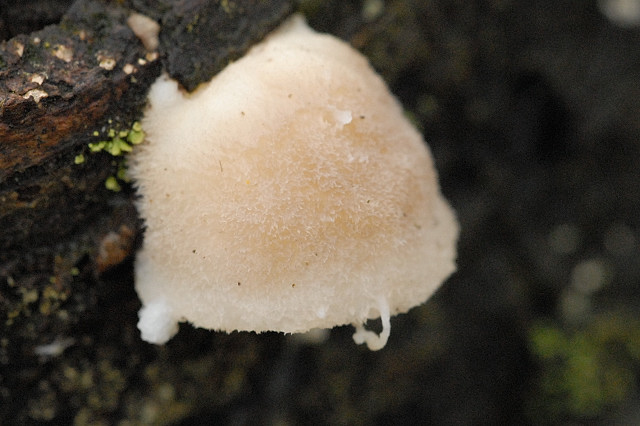

Scientific classification
- Kingdom: Fungi
- Division: Basidiomycota
- Class: Agaricomycetes
- Order: Polyporales
- Family: Fomitopsidaceae
- Genus: Postia
- Species: P. tephroleuca

Binomial name
- Postia tephroleuca (Fr.) Jülich (1982)

Synonyms
- Numerous, see text

= Postia tephroleuca =

Species of fungus

Postia tephroleuca, also known as greyling bracket, is a species of fungus in the family Fomitopsidaceae infecting broad-leaved trees, typically beech and plane.

This fungus has been recorded as a favored food of the pleasing fungus beetle Aporotritoma pulchra. Adults of the related beetle Tritoma biguttata biguttata have also been recorded from this fungus, but for them it does not seem to be a regular food source.

== Synonyms ==
This widespread and common fungus has been described under a large number of scientific names, which are now obsolete:

Bjerkandera adusta f. cinerata
Bjerkandera cinerata
Bjerkandera melina
Bjerkandera simulans
Boletus tephroleucus
Leptoporus tephroleucus
Oligoporus tephroleucus
Piptoporus elatinus
Polyporus elatinus
Polyporus linearisporus
Polyporus melinus
Polyporus tephroleucus
Polyporus tokyoensis [as 'tokyvensis']
Polystictus tephroleucus
Spongiporus tephroleucus
Tyromyces elatinus
Tyromyces melinus
Tyromyces tephroleucus
