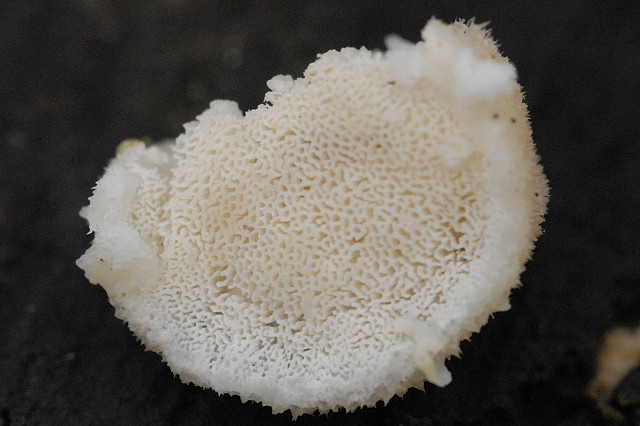
- Postia tephroleuca

Scientific classification
- Kingdom: Fungi
- Division: Basidiomycota
- Class: Agaricomycetes
- Order: Polyporales
- Family: Fomitopsidaceae
- Genus: Postia; Fr. (1874)

Type species
- Postia tephroleuca (Fr.) Jülich (1982)

Synonyms
- Trichoderma Pers. (1801); Podoporia P.Karst. (1892); Spongiporus Murrill (1905); Hemidiscia Lázaro Ibiza (1916); Osteina Donk (1966); Strangulidium Pouzar (1967)

= Postia =

Genus of fungi

Postia is a genus of brown rot fungi in the family Fomitopsidaceae.

== Taxonomy ==
Postia was circumscribed by mycologist Elias Magnus Fries in his 1874 work Hymenomycetes europaei. The genus name honours Swedish naturalist Hampus von Post (1822–1911).

== Species ==
A 2008 estimate placed 30 species in the genus. As of June 2018, Index Fungorum accepts 57 species of Postia:

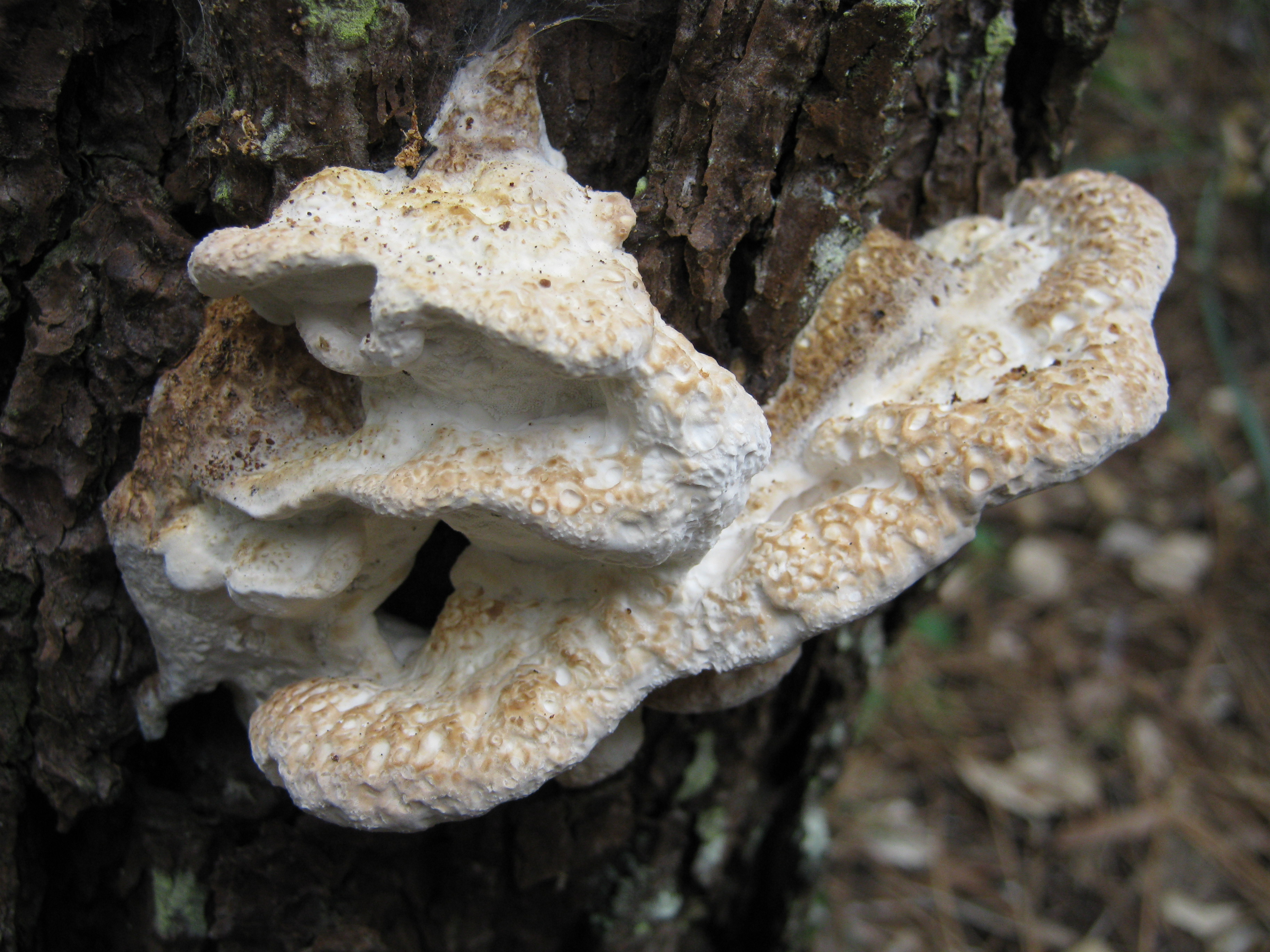
Postia guttulata

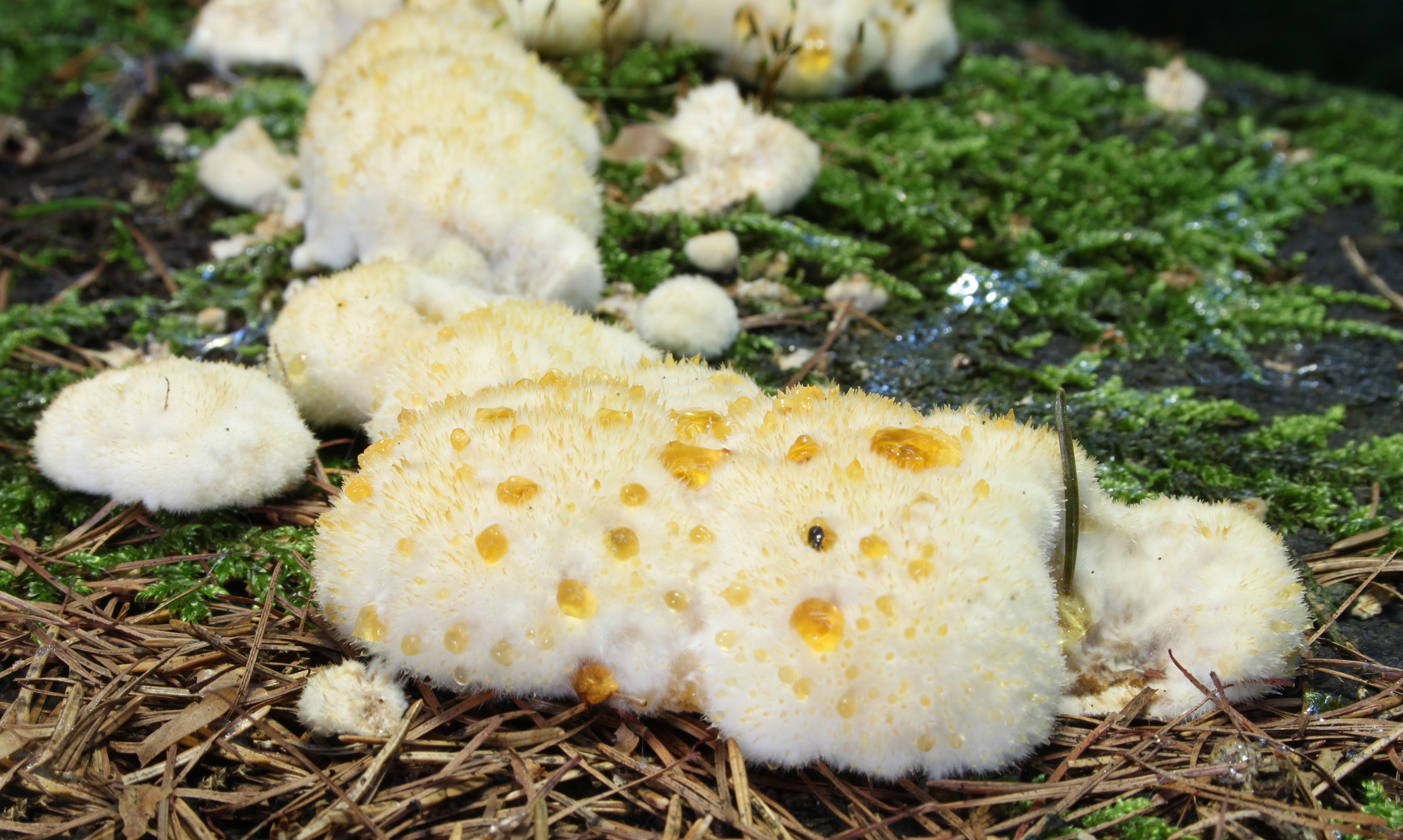
Postia ptychogaster

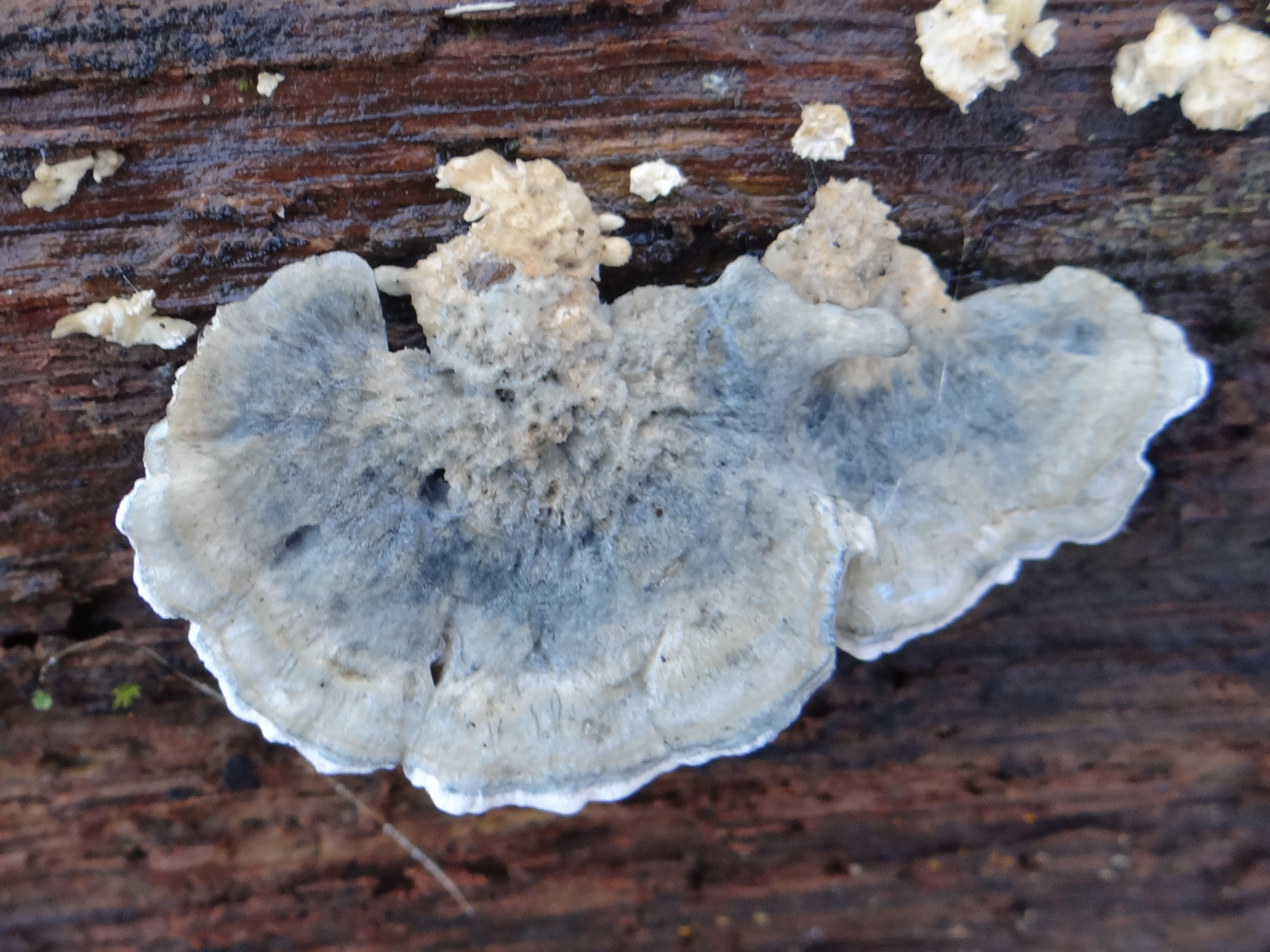
Postia subcaesia

- Postia africana (Ryvarden) V.Papp (2015)
- Postia amurensis Y.C.Dai & Penttilä (2006) – China
- Postia amylocystis Y.C.Dai & Renvall (1994) – China
- Postia amyloidea (Corner) V.Papp (2015)
- Postia balsamea (Peck) Jülich (1982)
- Postia brunnea Rajchenb. & P.K.Buchanan (1996) – Australia; New Zealand
- Postia caesia (Schrad.) P.Karst. (1881) – Europe; also called the conifer blueing bracket
- Postia caesioflava (Pat.) V.Papp (2015)
- Postia calcarea Y.L.Wei & Y.C.Dai (2006) – China
- Postia cana H.S.Yuan & Y.C.Dai (2010)
- Postia carbophila Rajchenb. (1995) – South America
- Postia ceriflua (Berk. & M.A.Curtis) Jülich (1982)
- Postia coeruleivirens (Corner) V.Papp (2015) – East and Southeast Asia
- Postia cylindrica H.S.Yuan (2017) – China
- Postia dissecta (Cooke) Rajchenb. (1988)
- Postia duplicata L.L.Shen, B.K.Cui & Y.C.Dai (2014)
- Postia floriformis (Quél.) Jülich (1982)
- Postia fragilis (Fr.) Jülich (1982) – Europe
- Postia globicystidia P.K.Buchanan & Ryvarden (1998) – New Zealand
- Postia gloeocystidiata Y.L.Wei & Y.C.Dai (2006) – China
- Postia grata (Berk.) Rajchenb. (1989) – Nepal
- Postia guttulata (Sacc.) Jülich (1982) – Europe; India
- Postia hibernica (Berk. & Broome) Jülich (1982) – Great Britain
- Postia immitis (Peck) Niemelä (2009)
- Postia inocybe (A.David & Malençon) Jülich (1982)
- Postia japonica Y.C.Dai & T.Hatt. (2007)
- Postia johnstonii (Murrill) Jülich (1982)
- Postia lateritia Renvall (1992) – Europe
- Postia leucomallella (Murrill) Jülich (1982) – Europe
- Postia lowei (Pilát) Jülich (1982) – Great Britain
- Postia luteocaesia (A.David) Jülich (1982) – Europe
- Postia manuka (G.Cunn.) P.K.Buchanan & Ryvarden (2000)
- Postia mediterraneocaesia M. Pieri & B.Rivoire (2005) – Europe
- Postia minuta Rajchenb. (2001) – Argentina
- Postia obliqua Y.L.Wei & W.M.Qin (2010) – China
- Postia pelliculosa (Berk.) Rajchenb. (1988) – Uganda
- Postia perdelicata (Murrill) M.J.Larsen & Lombard (1986)
- Postia ptychogaster (F.Ludw.) Vesterh. (1996) – Europe
- Postia punctata Rajchenb. & P.K.Buchanan (1996) – South America; Tasmania
- Postia qinensis Y.C.Dai & Y.L.Wei (2009) – China
- Postia rancida (Bres.) M.J.Larsen & Lombard (1986) – Great Britain
- Postia rennyi (Berk. & Broome) Rajchenb. (1993) – Europe
- Postia septentrionalis (Vampola) Renvall (1992)
- Postia sericeomollis (Romell) Jülich (1982) – Europe
- Postia simanii (Pilát) Jülich (1982)
- Postia stellifera T.Hatt. & Sotome (2011) – Malaysia
- Postia stiptica (Pers.) Jülich (1982) – Europe; also called the bitter bracket
- Postia subcaesia (A.David) Jülich (1982) – Europe; also called the blueing bracket
- Postia subplacenta B.K.Cui (2012) – China
- Postia subundosa Y.L.Wei & Y.C.Dai (2006) – China
- Postia tephroleuca (Fr.) Jülich (1982) – Asia, Europe
- Postia undosa (Peck) Jülich (1982) – Europe, North America
- Postia venata (Rajchenb. & J.E.Wright) Rajchenb. (1988)
- Postia zebra Y.L.Wei & W.M.Qin (2010) – China

In a 2018 revision of the Postia caesia complex, Otto Miettinen and colleagues proposed four new combinations, and described ten new species:

- P. alni Niemelä & Vampola (2018) – Europe
- P. arbuti Spirin (2018) – North America
- P. auricoma Spirin & Niemelä (2018 – Eurasia
- P. bifaria Spirin (2018) – East Asia
- P. caesiosimulans (G.F.Atk.) Spirin & Miettinen (2018) – Holarctic
- P. comata Miettinen (2018) – Northeastern United States
- P. cyanescens Miettinen (2018) – Europe
- P. glauca Spirin & Miettinen (2018) – East Asia
- P. gossypina (Moug. & Lév.) Spirin & Rivoire (2018) – Europe
- P. livens Miettinen & Vlasák (2018) – North America
- P. magna Miettinen (2018) – China; South Korea
- P. populi Miettinen (2018) – Holarctic
- P. simulans (P.Karst.) Spirin & Rivoire (2018) – Holarctic
- P. subviridis (Ryvarden & Guzmán) Spirin (2018) – Europe; North America
- P. yanae Miettinen & Kotiranta (2018) – Eastern Siberia
