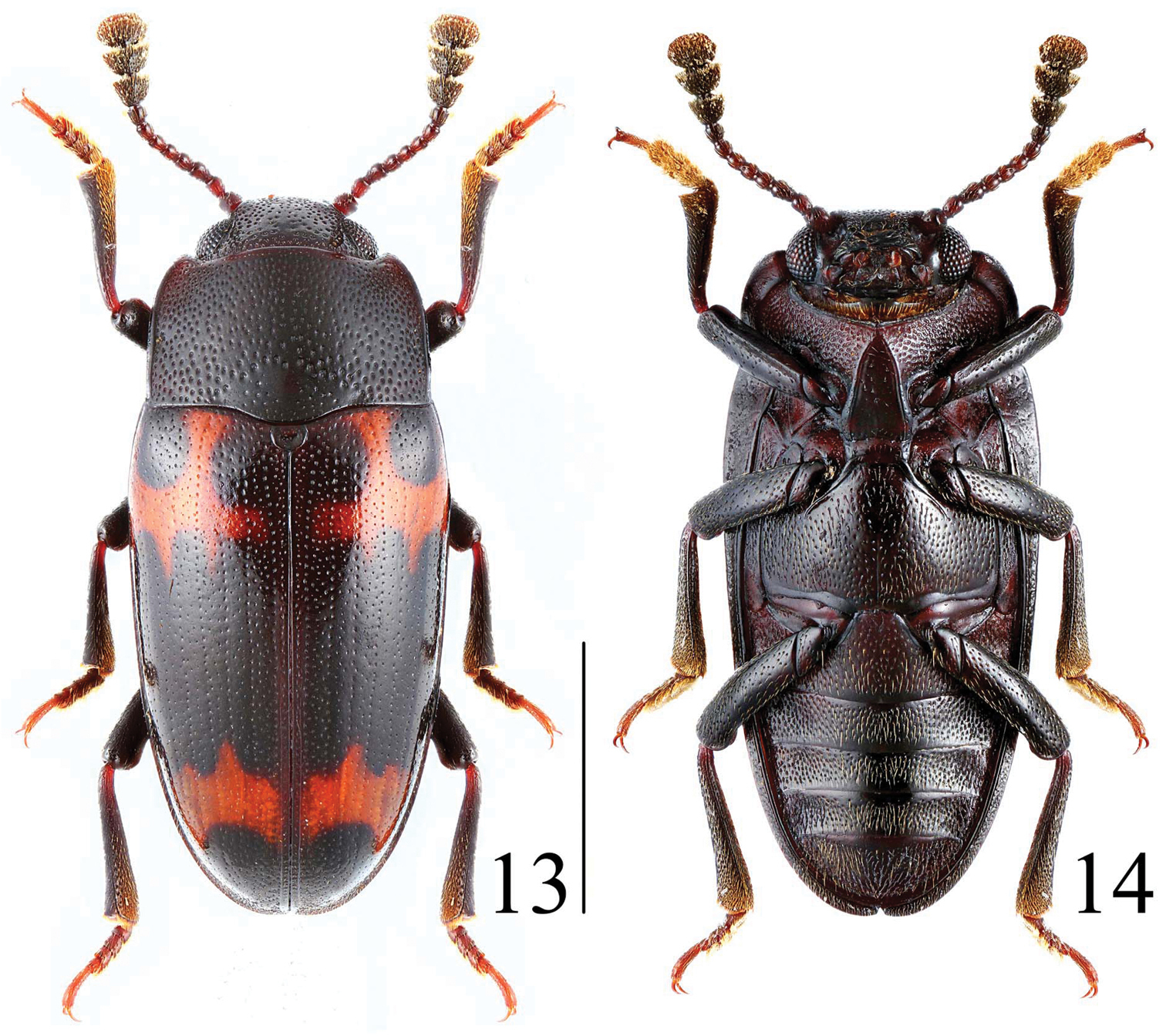
- M.perforatus, adult from top and below

Scientific classification
- Kingdom: Animalia
- Phylum: Arthropoda
- Clade: Pancrustacea
- Class: Insecta
- Order: Coleoptera
- Suborder: Polyphaga
- Infraorder: Cucujiformia
- Family: Erotylidae
- Tribe: Dacnini
- Genus: Microsternus; Lewis, 1887

Type species
- Megalodacne ulkei Crotch, 1879

Synonyms
- Microsternum (lapsus)

= Microsternus =

Genus of beetles

Microsternus is a genus of pleasing fungus beetles (family Erotylidae) with about 15 species. In its family, it is placed in tribe Dacnini of subfamily Erotylinae, or in a distinct subfamily Dacninae.

Its scientific name refers to the fact that the middle part of the sternum is reduced to a very short (Ancient Greek: μικρο- mikro-, "small") length by a forward expansion of the metasternum. This results in a "4+2" positioning of the front-/mid- + hindlegs, which is not obvious from above but can be appreciated by looking at these beetles' undersides.

== Description ==
Even by the standards of their family, these are small beetles, about 0.6 cm (0.2 in) at most when adult and of oval shape with distinctly "clubbed" antenna tips made up from recognizably distinct segments. Their carapace is covered in mid-sized and rather densely scattered punctuations. The compound eyes have comparatively large ommatidia, which is typically found in beetles with crepuscular or nocturnal habits. The maxilla of the mouthparts has a small hairy brush at the tip of galea and lacinia, consisting of a few slim hairs within a clump of thick or flat hairs, and its palps end in a segment that is longer than wide. The mentum of the labium is conspicuously wide, but not very high.

The pronotum bulges at the rear towards the scutellum and has strong margins on the side, thickest at the edges near the head; elsewhere it is unmargined. The prosternum has a flattened bell-shaped area between the attachments of the foreleg coxae, which goes almost for the entire length of the prosternum and widens towards the rear. Between this and the expanded metasternum, the mesosternum is reduced to a tiny strip, shorter in fact than the midleg coxa attachments which are thus immediately adjacent the foreleg attachments. The hindleg coxae, however, attached far down the body, separated from the midlegs by the elongation of the metasternum. Hence, seen from below these beetles have the four fore- and midlegs arranged in a short and wide rectangle close to each other at the very front of the thorax, while the two hindlegs are located almost at the very end of the thorax. Seen from above, this peculiar leg arrangement is not discernible. The lines along the hindleg attachments are shortened on the metathorax, and absent on the abdomen, in many if not all members of this genus.

The wings are covered in rather irregular punctuations as the rest of the body, instead of having distinct neat lengthwise lines of larger point-marks. tibiae and tarsi of the legs are robust, but not excessively thickened. The tarsal formula is 5-5-5, with the first three segments carrying distinct "pads" on their undersurface and being of about equal size, barely larger than the fourth; segment 5 bears claws.

== Distribution and ecology ==
This genus occurs from Bhutan and easternmost India to northeastern Asia (Japan and nearby China and Russia), as well as southeastwards throughout Southeast Asia and the Wallacea; one species is found in northeastern Australia. In addition, the type species M.ulkei is widespread in the northeastern US; given the general inability of Erotylidae to cross long stretches of open ocean, it may in fact be the only true member of this genus, with the Asian and Australian species liable to be split off.

The ecology of these beetles remains almost unknown. Like their relatives, they probably eat fungi as adults and larvae. M.cribricollis was collected in India from "a fungus on dry wood", but no specific information is given as to the identity of the fungus or the wood.

== Species ==
The composition of Microsternus has changed considerably in recent decades and by he early 2020s was still not robustly resolved. While a number of formerly unknown Asian beetles have been discovered and described in this genus since the start of the 21st century, "M."higonius, "M."hisamatsui and "M."taiwanus were moved to a new genus Neosternus in 2013.

Species belonging to the genus Microsternus are:

- Microsternus bhutanensis Chûjô, 1975
- Microsternus cribricollis (Gorham, 1895) (= M.lepida)
- Microsternus crotchi Lewis, 1887
- Microsternus javanus Deelder, 1942
- Microsternus nakanoi Narukawa, 2004
- Microsternus pengzhongi Dai & Zhao, 2013
- Microsternus perforatus (Lewis, 1883)
- Microsternus puncticollis Heller, 1918 (1920)
- Microsternus quatei Chûjô, 1968
- Microsternus queenslandicus Heller, 1918 (1920)
- Microsternus sumatranus Deelder, 1942
- Microsternus tokioensis Nakane, 1961 (formerly in M.tricolor)
- Microsternus tricolor Lewis, 1887 (= M.taiwanicus)
- Microsternus ulkei (Crotch, 1873)
- Microsternus yamadai Chûjô & Shibata, 1963
