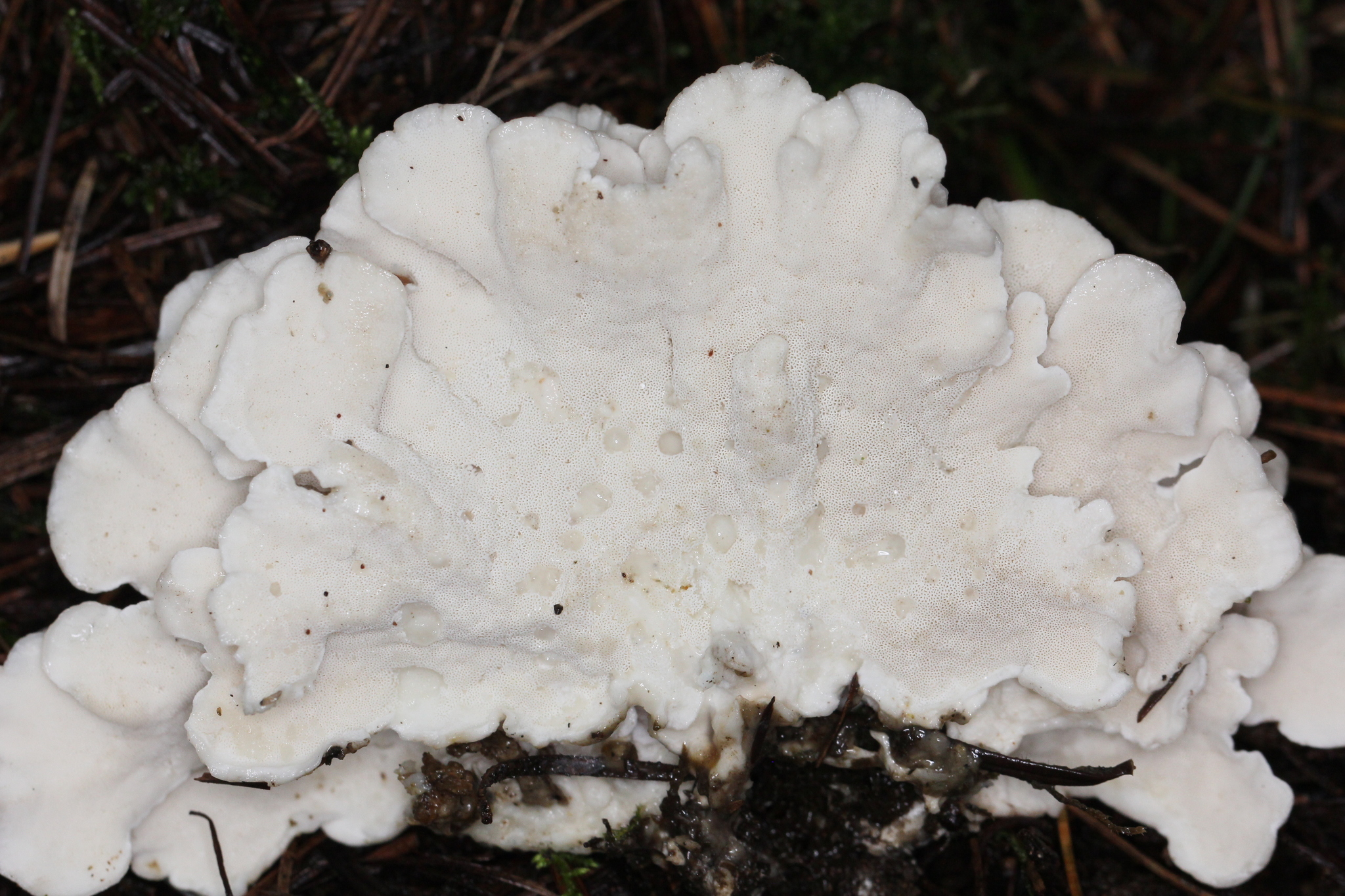

Scientific classification
- Kingdom: Fungi
- Division: Basidiomycota
- Class: Agaricomycetes
- Order: Polyporales
- Family: Dacryobolaceae
- Genus: Spongiporus
- Species: S. floriformis

Binomial name
- Spongiporus floriformis (Quélet) Zmitrovich, 2018

= Spongiporus floriformis =

Species of fungus

Spongiporus floriformis is a species of fungus belonging to the family Dacryobolaceae.

Synonym:

- Polyporus floriformis Quél., 1884 (= basionym)

Adults of the pleasing fungus beetle Aporotritoma pulchra have been recorded from this fungus, but it does not seem to be a regular food source for them.
