= Postia duplicata =

Scientific classification
- Domain: Eukaryota
- Kingdom: Fungi
- Division: Basidiomycota
- Class: Agaricomycetes
- Order: Polyporales
- Family: Fomitopsidaceae
- Genus: Postia
- Species: P. duplicata

Binomial name
- Postia duplicata L.L.Shen, B.K.Cui & Y.C.Dai (2014)

Species of fungus

Postia duplicata is a species of poroid fungus in the family Fomitopsidaceae that was described as a new species in 2014. It is found in Yunnan and Zhejiang provinces of China, where it causes a brown rot on angiosperm wood. The fungus is named (duplicata) for its characteristic two-layered context, a feature that distinguishes it from other Postia species. The spores made by this fungus are cylindrical, hyaline, smooth, and typically measure 3.8–5.8 by 1.8–2.5 μm.
