= Postia amylocystis =

Scientific classification
- Domain: Eukaryota
- Kingdom: Fungi
- Division: Basidiomycota
- Class: Agaricomycetes
- Order: Polyporales
- Family: Fomitopsidaceae
- Genus: Postia
- Species: P. amylocystis

Binomial name
- Postia amylocystis Y.C.Dai & Renvall (1994)

Species of fungus

Postia amylocystis is a species of poroid fungus in the family Fomitopsidaceae. Found In China, the fungus was described as new to science in 1994 by mycologists Yu-Cheng Dai and Pertti Renvall. The original type collections were made in the Changbai Mountain Range, where the fungus was found growing on a decayed trunk of Manchurian lime (Tilia mandshurica). Characteristics that distinguish P. amylocystis from other Postia species include thick-walled cystidia in the hymenium, and narrow, sausage-shaped (allantoid) spores. The specific epithet amylocystis refers to the amyloid cystidia, and hints at a possible phylogenetic relationship to Amylocystis lapponica.
