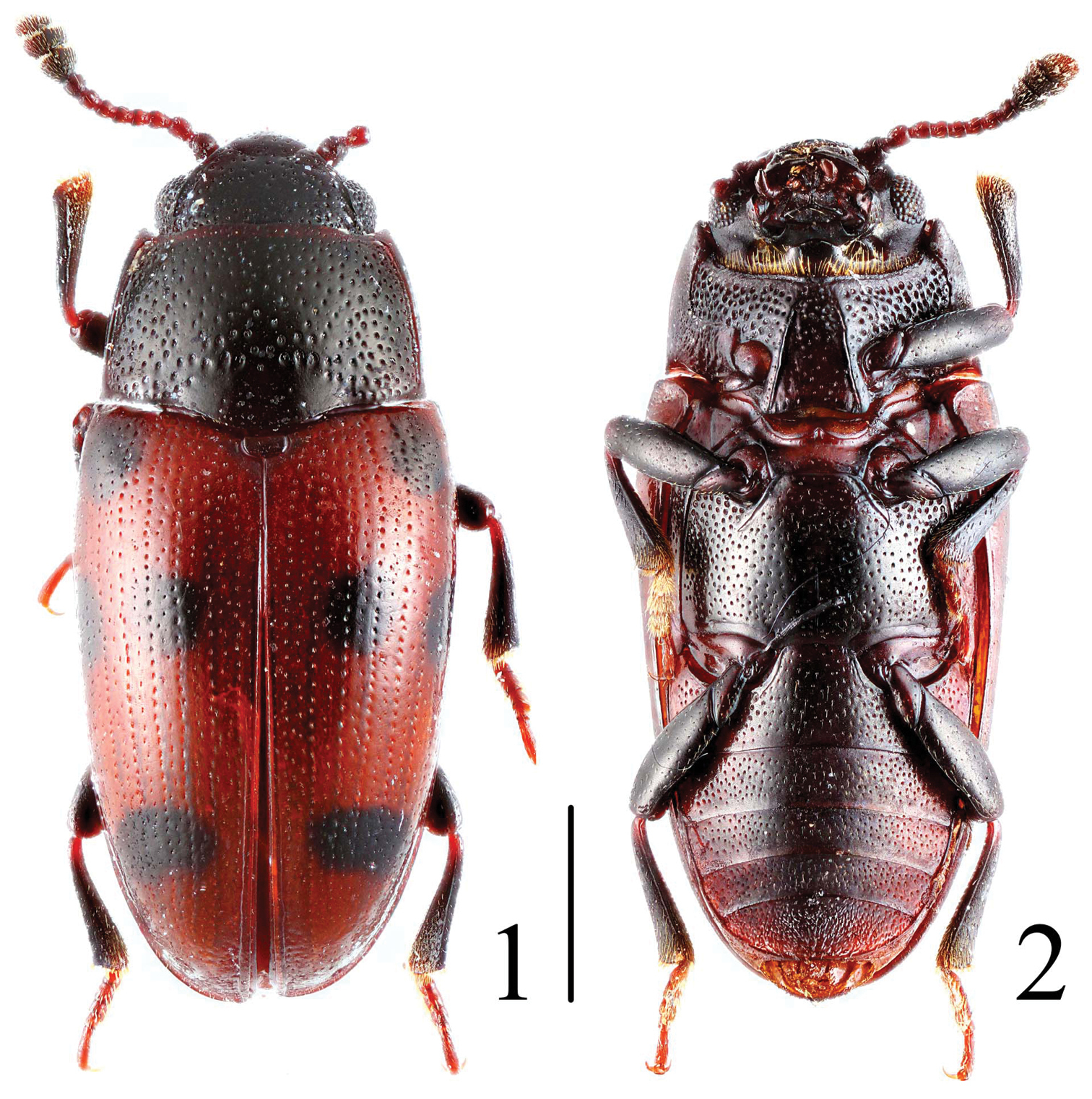
- Adult specimen (somewhat damaged) from top (left) and below (right)

Scientific classification
- Kingdom: Animalia
- Phylum: Arthropoda
- Clade: Pancrustacea
- Class: Insecta
- Order: Coleoptera
- Suborder: Polyphaga
- Infraorder: Cucujiformia
- Family: Erotylidae
- Genus: Microsternus
- Species: M. ulkei

Binomial name
- Microsternus ulkei (Crotch, 1873)

Synonyms
- Megalodacne ulkei Crotch, 1873

= Microsternus ulkei =

Species of beetle

Microsternus ulkei is a species of pleasing fungus beetle (family Erotylidae). In its family, it is placed in tribe Dacnini of subfamily Erotylinae, or in a distinct subfamily Dacninae if the Erotylinae are more narrowly circumscribed. M.ulkei is endemic to the northeastern (Atlantic) USA.

This is the only American member of its genus; all other Microsternus have a Pacific distribution, occurring from northeastern Asia (Japan and the adjacent mainland) to northeastern Australia. Pleasing fungus beetles are known to have a rather low capacity for long-range dispersal, with few species found on oceanic islands and many restricted-range endemics. Consequently, it is by no means certain that M.ulkei is congeneric with the Asian species traditionally allied with it, some of which are in fact separated as a distinct genus Neosternus by recent authors. As M.ulkei is the type species of Microsternus, however, it may well be that the genus is ultimately reduced to this species only.

Microsternus ulkei inhabits mature deciduous forests, where it eats hard-bodied shelf fungi ("conks").
