= Calcipostia =

Scientific classification
- Domain: Eukaryota
- Kingdom: Fungi
- Division: Basidiomycota
- Class: Agaricomycetes
- Order: Polyporales
- Family: Fomitopsidaceae
- Genus: Calcipostia
- Species: C. guttulata

Binomial name
- Calcipostia guttulata B.K.Cui, L.L.Shen & Y.C.Dai

Genus of fungi

Calcipostia is a monotypic genus of fungi belonging to the family Fomitopsidaceae. The only species is Calcipostia guttulata.

The species scientific name is Calcipostia guttulata (Peck) B.K.Cui, L.L.Shen & Y.C.Dai, 2018.

Synonym:

- Postia guttulata (Peck) Jülich, 1982
