= Russula redolens =

Scientific classification
- Domain: Eukaryota
- Kingdom: Fungi
- Division: Basidiomycota
- Class: Agaricomycetes
- Order: Russulales
- Family: Russulaceae
- Genus: Russula
- Species: R. redolens

Binomial name
- Russula redolens Burl.

Species of fungus

Russula redolens, commonly known as the parsley-scented russula, is a basidiomycete mushroom of the genus Russula native to North America. Its flesh smells of parsley.

== See also ==
- List of Russula species
