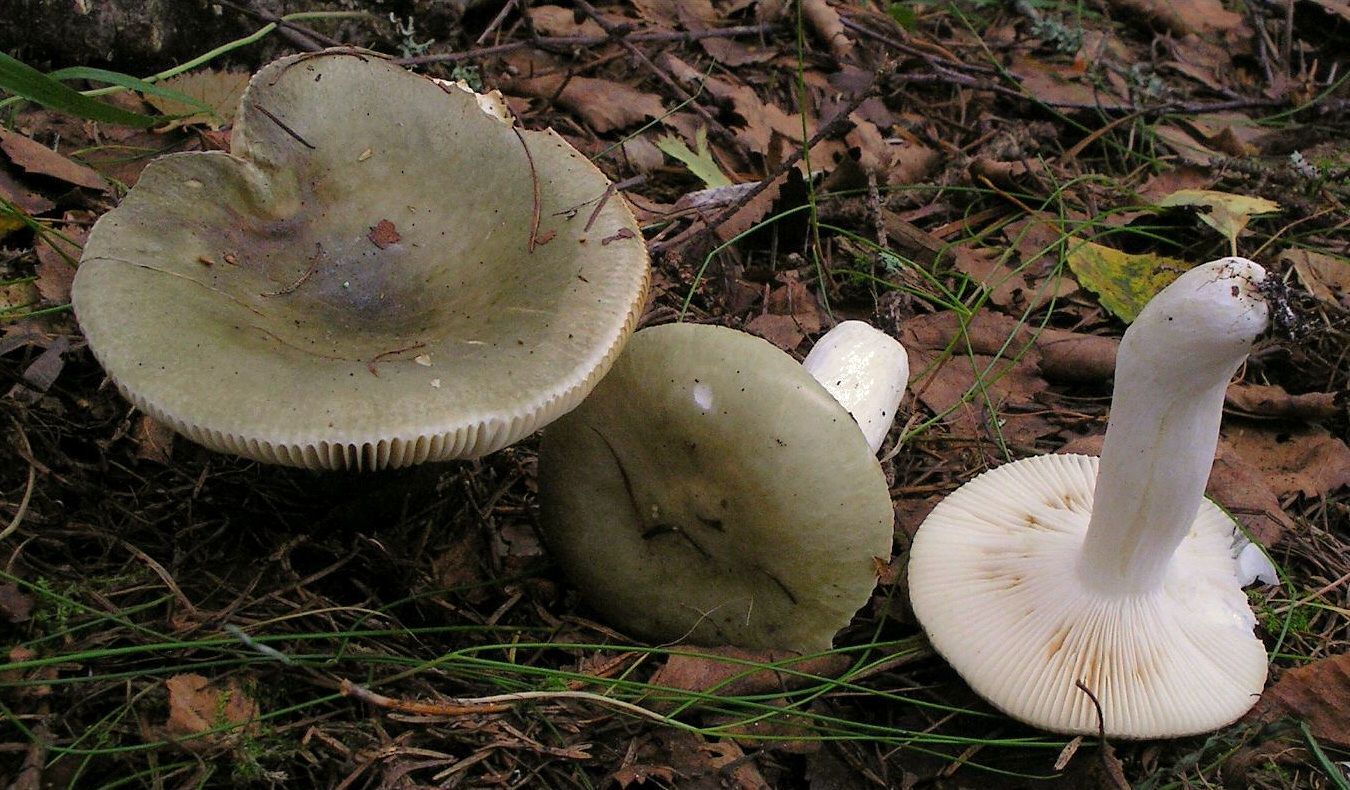

Conservation status
- Secure (NatureServe)

Scientific classification
- Kingdom: Fungi
- Division: Basidiomycota
- Class: Agaricomycetes
- Order: Russulales
- Family: Russulaceae
- Genus: Russula
- Species: R. aeruginea

Binomial name
- Russula aeruginea Fr. (1863)

= Russula aeruginea =

Species of fungus

Russula aeruginea
- Mycological characteristics
- Gills on hymenium
- Cap is convex or depressed
- Hymenium is adnexed or adnate
- Stipe is bare
- Spore print is white
- Ecology is mycorrhizal
- Edibility is edible

Russula aeruginea, also known as the green brittlegill, grass-green russula, the tacky green russula, or the green russula, is an edible Russula mushroom. Widely distributed in northern temperate regions, it is usually found under birch, mostly in pine forests.

== Taxonomy ==
The species was first described in Elias Magnus Fries's 1863 work Monographia Hymenomycetum Sueciae. The specific epithet aeruginea is derived from the Latin aeruginus, referring to the tarnished color of copper. It is commonly known variously as the "tacky green Russula", the "grass-green Russula", or the "green Russula".

== Description ==
The cap is flat when young, soon funnel shaped and weakly striped; somewhat sticky and shiny, pale green to light grey-green, more rarely olive green. It is often 4 to 10 cm (1.6 to 3.9 in) in diameter. The closely spaced gills are pale cream when young, later becoming light yellow when the spores mature. The stipe is white, occasionally with rust-coloured spots at the base, often rather short with longitudinal furrows. It measures 5–8 cm (2.0–3.1 in) long by 1–2 cm (0.4–0.8 in) thick. The flesh is white, brittle and without scent, with a mild taste.

The spore print is cream-yellow. The spores are spherical to oval with ridges and warts on the surface, and measure 6–8 by 6–7 μm.

=== Similar species ===
The very poisonous death cap can have a similar appearance, especially from above.

Green specimens of R. xerampelina (the crab brittlegill) are similar, but always smell of cooked shellfish. R. grisea and R. parazurea are also similar.

== Distribution and ecology ==
R.aeruginea is widely distributed in northern temperate zones. Fruiting occurs from July to November in Europe, and in late summer to autumn in North America. It is also found in East Africa.

The fruit bodies grow on the ground in woods, in troops in leaf litter or in grass. Thius species is ectomycorrhizal with birch, but also with found under conifers, particularly pine and spruce.

This mushroom has been recorded as an occasional food of adults of the pleasing fungus beetle Tritoma angulata

== Uses ==
The mushrooms are edible.

== See also ==
- List of Russula species
