= Spore print =

Fungi spore print color

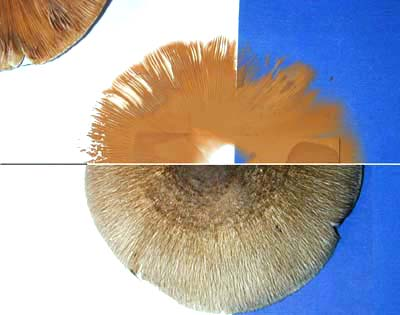
Making a spore print of the mushroom Volvariella volvacea shown in composite: (photo lower half) mushroom cap laid on white and dark paper; (photo upper half) cap removed after 24 hours showing warm orange ("tussock") color spore print. A 3.5-centimeter glass slide placed in middle allows for examination of spore characteristics under a microscope.

A printable chart to make a spore print and start identification

The spore print is the powdery deposit obtained by allowing spores of a fungal fruit body to fall onto a surface underneath. It is an important diagnostic character in most handbooks for identifying mushrooms. It shows the colour of the mushroom spores if viewed en masse.

== Method ==
A spore print is made by placing the spore-producing surface flat on a sheet of dark and white paper or on a sheet of clear, stiff plastic, which facilitates moving the spore print to a darker or lighter surface for improved contrast; for example, it is easier to determine whether the spore print is pure white or, rather, very slightly pigmented. The mushroom is left for several hours, often overnight, in this manner. Some guides advise using a moisture-resistant enclosure, like a glass or jar, to contain the mushroom during printing. If the mushroom is to be preserved, a small hole can be made in the spore print paper rather than cutting the stipe. When the mushroom is removed, the colour of the spores should be visible. Mycologists often use glass slides, which allow for quick examination of spores under a microscope. A mushroom cannot be identified from its spore print alone; the spore print is only one characteristic used in making a taxonomic determination. Spore prints are usually white to cream, black, or shades of red, purple, or brown. The poisonous false parasol (Chlorophyllum molybdites) has a green spore deposit. Although the spore print is generally used to help identify the genus of a specimen, on occasion it can be used to help distinguish between similar species. For example, the lookalikes Russula crustosa and Russula virescens have yellowish and white spore deposits, respectively.

In the field, spore print colour can sometimes be quickly determined by examining the top of stipes for spore "dust" on the nearby forest floor.

Collecting and examination of a spore print is not always successful. Some mushrooms are too young or too old to produce spores. Mushrooms collected at high elevations will typically not produce a spore print at lower elevations. Sometimes, the colour can vary depending on the thickness of the spore print. In the genus Lactarius, for example, thin deposits are usually white, while thick deposits are cream to yellow. Many of the original authors of species guides in this genus did not indicate whether spore print colours they recorded were with thick or thin prints, limiting the usefulness of this feature as an identification characteristic. In some instances, the colour of the spore print matches that of the mature gills, but this is not always true and gill colour cannot reliably be used as an indicator of spore print colour.

The North American Mycological Association (NAMA) created a 'how-to guide' for people interested in creating their own spore prints.

== Importance ==
Historically the classification of many families of fungi were based on spore colour, a feature first systematically emphasized by Swedish mycologist Elias Fries. An example is the Tricholomataceae, a large family containing many fungi whose common factor was having white spores. However recent molecular research has shown some strange relationships, with some fungi of disparate spore colours showing close relations.

== See also ==
- Mushroom hunting
