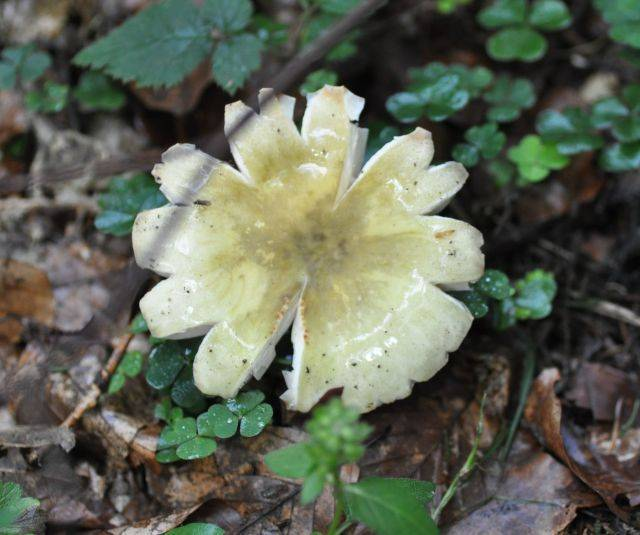

Scientific classification
- Kingdom: Fungi
- Division: Basidiomycota
- Class: Agaricomycetes
- Order: Russulales
- Family: Russulaceae
- Genus: Russula
- Species: R. violeipes

Binomial name
- Russula violeipes Quél. (1898)

Synonyms
- Russula heterophylla var. chlora Gillet (1876); Russula olivascens var. citrinus Quél. (1886); Russula xerampelina var. citrina (Quél.) Quél. (1888); Russula punctata f. citrina (Quél.) Maire (1910); Russula punctata f. violeipes (Quél.) Maire (1910); Russula amoena var. violeipes (Quél.) Singer (1932); Russula violeipes f. citrina (Quél.) Romagn. (1942); Russula violeipes var. citrina (Quél.) Sarnari (1998)

= Russula violeipes =

Species of fungus

Russula violeipes, commonly known as the velvet brittlegill, is a species of fungus in the family Russulaceae. It was described by French mycologist Lucien Quélet in 1898. An edible mushroom, it is found in Asia and Europe.
