= Lentinula madagasikarensis =

Scientific classification
- Kingdom: Fungi
- Division: Basidiomycota
- Class: Agaricomycetes
- Order: Agaricales
- Family: Omphalotaceae
- Genus: Lentinula
- Species: L. madagasikarensis

Binomial name
- Lentinula madagasikarensis Buyck, Randrianjohany & Looney 2021

Species of fungus

Lentinula madagasikarensis is a species of edible agaric fungus in the family Marasmiaceae that is found in Madagascar. It was described by Buyck, Randrianjohany & Looney in 2021. It is "strikingly" similar to the shiitake mushroom in appearance, but phylogenetic research shows its closest relative is Costa Rican Lentinula aciculospora. It grows on various dead wood in forests dominated by Uapaca densifolia, Sarcolaenaceae and Eucalyptus robusta. Its description expands the known range of Lentinula genus transoceanically and by over 4000 miles (from the Asian locations of shiitake)
