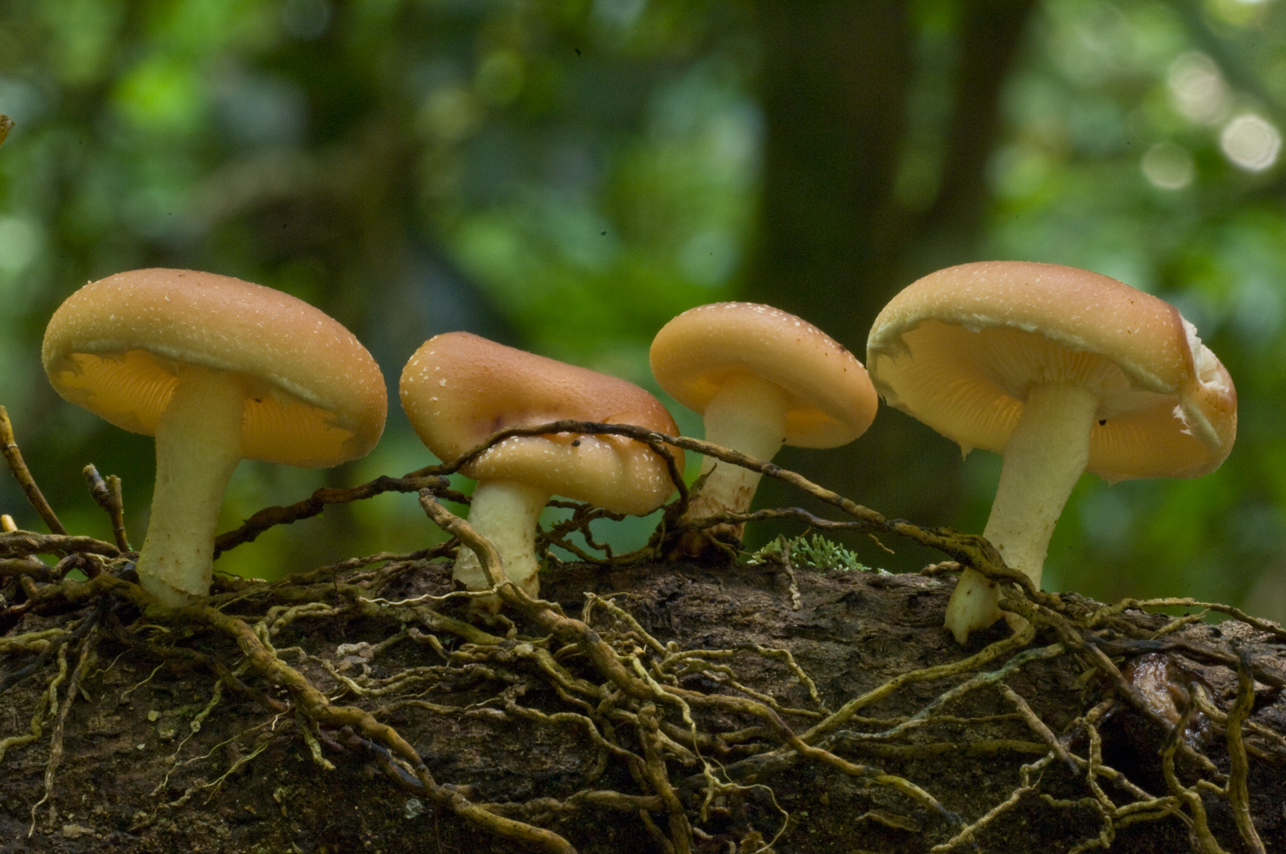

Scientific classification
- Kingdom: Fungi
- Division: Basidiomycota
- Class: Agaricomycetes
- Order: Agaricales
- Family: Omphalotaceae
- Genus: Lentinula
- Species: L. lateritia

Binomial name
- Lentinula lateritia (Berk.) Pegler (1983)

Synonyms
- Lentinus lateritius Berk. (1881); Pocillaria lateritia (Berk.) Kuntze (1891)

= Lentinula lateritia =

Species of fungus

Lentinula lateritia is a species of agaric fungus in the family Omphalotaceae. It is found in South-east Asia and Australasia, except for New Zealand. Originally described by Miles Joseph Berkeley in 1881 as a species of Agaricus, it was transferred to the genus Lentinula in 1983 by David Pegler.
