= Gymnopilus avellanus =

Scientific classification
- Kingdom: Fungi
- Division: Basidiomycota
- Class: Agaricomycetes
- Order: Agaricales
- Family: Hymenogastraceae
- Genus: Gymnopilus
- Species: G. avellanus

Binomial name
- Gymnopilus avellanus Pegler (1965)

Synonyms
- Agaricus avellanus Cooke & Massee (1889); Flammula avellanea Sacc. (1891)

Species of fungus

Gymnopilus avellanus Mycological characteristics
- Gills on hymenium
- Cap is convex
- Hymenium is adnexed or adnate
- Ecology is saprotrophic

Gymnopilus avellanus is a species of mushroom-forming fungus in the family Hymenogastraceae.

== See also ==
- List of Gymnopilus species
