= Lentinula ixodes =

Scientific classification
- Domain: Eukaryota
- Kingdom: Fungi
- Division: Basidiomycota
- Class: Agaricomycetes
- Order: Agaricales
- Family: Omphalotaceae
- Genus: Lentinula
- Species: L. ixodes

Binomial name
- Lentinula ixodes (Secr. ex Mont.) J.S. Oliveira, T.S. Cabral, Vargas-Isla & N.K. Ishik. 2022

Synonyms
- Agaricus ixodes Mont., Annls Sci. Nat., Bot., sér. 4 1: 95. 1854. Collybia ixodes (Mont.) Sacc., Syll. fung. (Abellini) 5: 232. 1887.

Species of fungus

Lentinula ixodes is a species of edible agaric fungus in the family Marasmiaceae that is found in Amazon rainforest. Originally described as Agaricus ixodes from Guyana by Camille Montagne in 1854, it was then considered a synonym of Lentinula boryana and reestablished as an independent species by J.S. Oliveira, Tiara S. Cabral, Ruby Vargas-Isla & Noemia K. Ishikawa in 2022. It grows on wood such as Bertholletia excelsa. Phylogenetic research shows it is closely related (but still intersterile) to another Amazon species, Lentinula raphanica, but it can be visually distinguished by the deep orange-brown pileus eventually having fine scales and general similarity to L. boryana complex.
