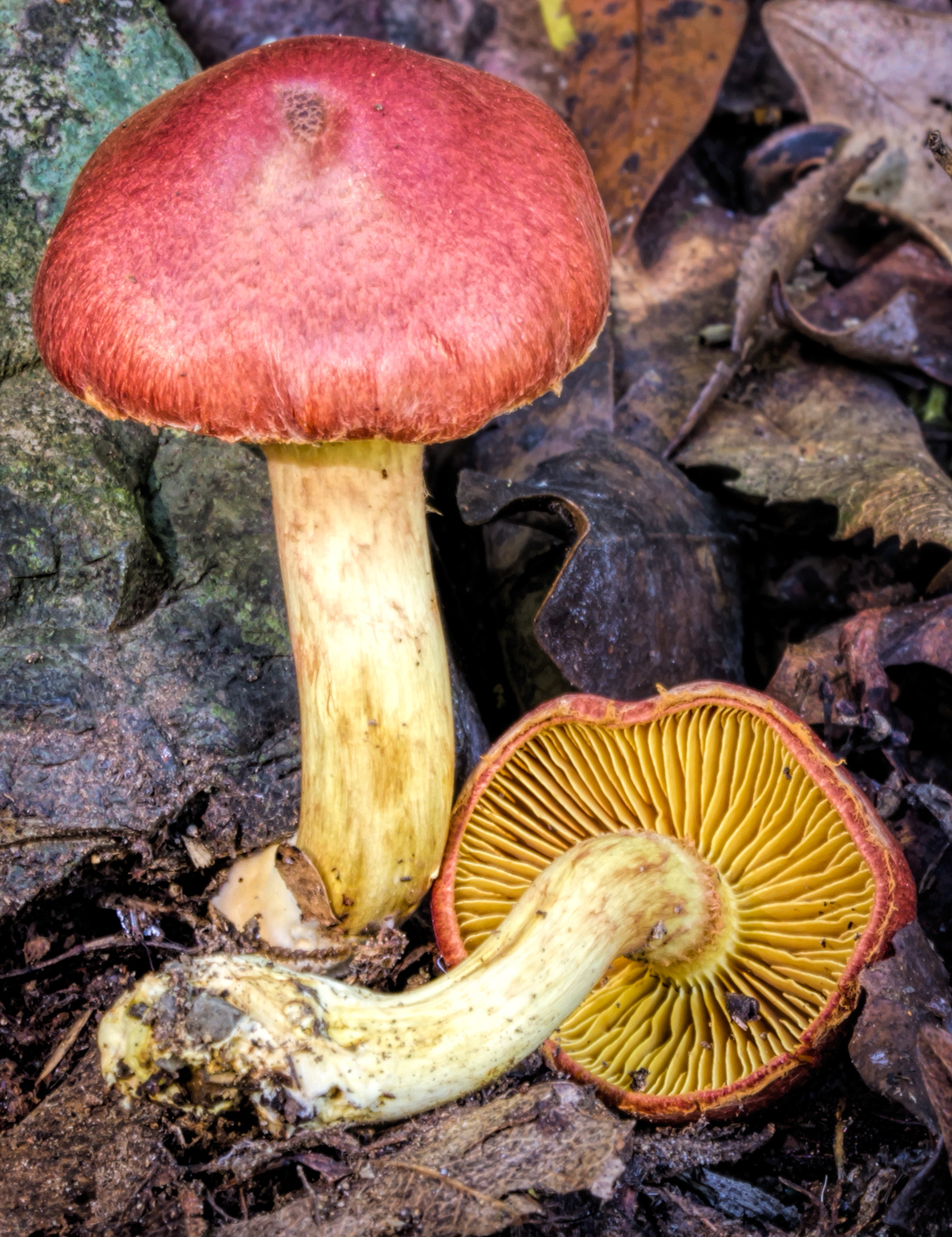

Scientific classification
- Kingdom: Fungi
- Division: Basidiomycota
- Class: Agaricomycetes
- Order: Agaricales
- Family: Hymenogastraceae
- Genus: Gymnopilus
- Species: G. crociphyllus

Binomial name
- Gymnopilus crociphyllus (Cooke & Massee) Pegler

Synonyms
- Agaricus crociphyllus Cooke & Massee; Agaricus xanthophyllus Cooke & Massee; Flammula crociphylla Sacc.; Flammula xanthophylla McAlpine; Gymnopilus crocophyllus (Sacc.) Pegler

= Gymnopilus crociphyllus =

Species of fungus

Gymnopilus crociphyllus
- Mycological characteristics
- Gills on hymenium
- Cap is convex
- Hymenium is adnexed or adnate
- Ecology is saprotrophic

Gymnopilus crociphyllus is a species of mushroom in the family Hymenogastraceae.

== See also ==
List of Gymnopilus species
