= Leucocoprinus martinicensis =

Scientific classification
- Kingdom: Fungi
- Division: Basidiomycota
- Class: Agaricomycetes
- Order: Agaricales
- Family: Agaricaceae
- Genus: Leucocoprinus
- Species: L. martinicensis

Binomial name
- Leucocoprinus martinicensis Blanco-Dios (2020)

Synonyms
- Leucocoprinus tenellus Pegler (1983)

Species of fungus

Leucocoprinus martinicensis
- Mycological characteristics
- Gills on hymenium
- Cap is campanulate or flat
- Hymenium is free
- Stipe is bare
- Spore print is white to yellow
- Ecology is saprotrophic
- Edibility is unknown

Leucocoprinus martinicensis is a species of mushroom producing fungus in the family Agaricaceae.

== Taxonomy ==
It was first described in 1983 by the British mycologist David Pegler who classified it as Leucocoprinus tenellus however this was an illegitimate name since it had already been used for another species.

It was reclassified by the mycologist Jaime Bernardo Blanco-Dios in 2020 as Leucocoprinus martinicensis.

Pegler states that the species may have been recorded in 1851 from Costa Rica by Elias Magnus Fries as Agaricus (Hiatula) crenulatus. However this citation is incorrect as Agaricus crenulatus is documented as being beige-purple. The correct spelling of the name is Agaricus (Hiatula) crenulata and since the description of this species is very similar, it can be assumed that this is what Pegler intended to compare it to.

== Description ==
Leucocoprinus martinicensis is a small dapperling mushroom with thin, unchanging yellowish white flesh that may be up to 1.5mm thick at the cap disc.

Cap: 3.5-7cm wide, starting conical or campanulate (bell shaped) before flattening with a shallow depression around the small umbo. The surface is pale yellow and covered with brown woolly scales (floccose squamules) whilst the centre disc is smooth, brown and fades to brownish orange with age. The cap edges are heavily striated (plicate-striate) up the cap surface almost to the centre disc. Gills: Free with a collar, close at 4mm wide and yellowish white. Stem: 7.7-13 cm long and 3.5-8mm thick tapering slightly from the club shaped base where white mycelium is present. The surface is pale yellow with shiny, loose woolly scales but soon becomes smooth whilst the interior is hollow. The presence of a stem ring has not been documented, it may either quickly disappear or be absent to begin with. Spore print: Yellowish white. Spores: Ovoid to ellipsoid with a germ pore. Dextrinoid. 10.5-14.4 x 7.7-9.8 μm. Smell: Indistinct.

Fries' description of Agaricus (Hiatula) crenulata is very similar and only differs in the spore colour which he describes as white rather than the yellowish white of L. martinicensis. Such a difference might simply come down to the differences in personal perception and description of colour however.

== Habitat and distribution ==
L. martinicensis is scarcely recorded and little known.

A 2006 study documented this species from Kerala state, India where it was found growing individually or in groups on soil.

== Similar species ==
- Leucocoprinus fragilissimus appears very similar but lacks yellow pigmentation in the spores which are also smaller than those of Leucocoprinus martinicensis.
