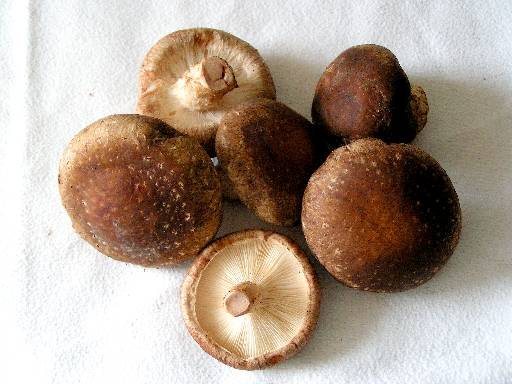
- Lentinula edodes

Scientific classification
- Kingdom: Fungi
- Division: Basidiomycota
- Class: Agaricomycetes
- Order: Agaricales
- Family: Omphalotaceae
- Genus: Lentinula; Earle

Type species
- Lentinula cubensis (Berk. & Curtis) Earle ex Pegler

Species
- See text

= Lentinula =

Genus of fungi

Lentinula is a small genus of wood-inhabiting agarics. The neotropical species Lentinula boryana (= L. cubensis) is the type species. However, the best-known species is L. edodes, the shiitake. The genus was erected by Franklin Sumner Earle in 1909, and as of 2023 contains ten species, principally found in tropical regions.

== Species ==
Image	Scientific name	Distribution
	Lentinula aciculospora R.H. Petersen 2000	Costa Rica
	Lentinula boryana (Berk. & Mont.) Pegler 1976	Subtropical America
	Lentinula edodes (Berk.) Pegler 1976	Asia
	Lentinula guarapiensis (Speg.) Pegler 1983	Paraguay
	Lentinula ixodes (Secr. ex Mont.) J.S. Oliveira, T.S. Cabral, Vargas-Isla & N.K. Ishik. 2022	Amazon rainforest
	Lentinula lateritia (Berk.) Pegler 1983	South-east Asia and Australasia
	Lentinula madagasikarensis Buyck, Randrianjohany & Looney 2021	Madagascar
	Lentinula novae-zelandiae (G. Stev.) Pegler 1983	New Zealand
	Lentinula raphanica (Murrill) Mata & R.H. Petersen 2001	Amazon rainforest
	Lentinula reticeps (Mont.) Murrill (1915)	United States

== See also ==
- List of Marasmiaceae genera
- Shiitake
