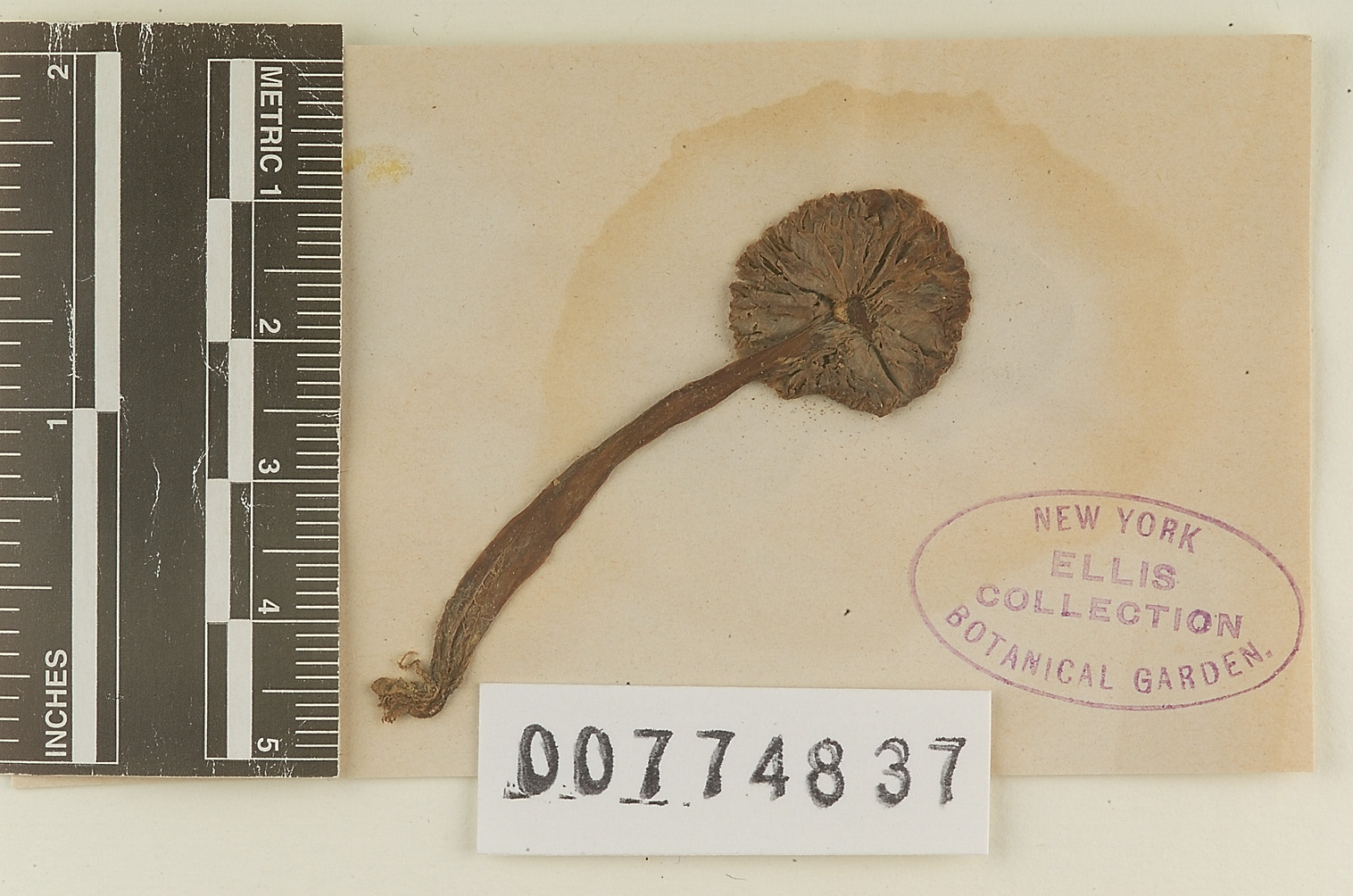

Scientific classification
- Kingdom: Fungi
- Division: Basidiomycota
- Class: Agaricomycetes
- Order: Agaricales
- Family: Omphalotaceae
- Genus: Lentinula
- Species: L. guarapiensis

Binomial name
- Lentinula guarapiensis (Speg.) Pegler (1983)

Synonyms
- Agaricus guarapiensis Speg. (1883); Pleurotus guarapiensis (Speg.) Speg. (1887); Dendrosarcus guarapiensis (Speg.) Kuntze (1898); Lentinus guarapiensis (Speg.) Singer (1952)

= Lentinula guarapiensis =

Species of fungus

Lentinula guarapiensis is a species of agaric fungus in the family Omphalotaceae that is found in Paraguay. Originally described by Carlos Luigi Spegazzini in 1883 as Agaricus guarapiensis, it was moved to the genus Lentinula by David Pegler in 1983. It is only known from the type collection.
