= Leucocoprinus tenellus =

Scientific classification
- Kingdom: Fungi
- Division: Basidiomycota
- Class: Agaricomycetes
- Order: Agaricales
- Family: Agaricaceae
- Genus: Leucocoprinus
- Species: L. tenellus

Binomial name
- Leucocoprinus tenellus (Boud.) Locq. (1943)

Synonyms
- Lepiota tenella Boud. (1905); Leucocoprinus emilei E.Ludw.(2012)

Species of fungus

Leucocoprinus tenellus
- Mycological characteristics
- Gills on hymenium
- Cap is campanulate or flat
- Hymenium is free
- Stipe has a ring
- Spore print is white
- Ecology is saprotrophic
- Edibility is unknown

Leucocoprinus tenellus is a species of mushroom producing fungus in the family Agaricaceae.

== Taxonomy ==
It was first described in 1905 by the French mycologist Jean Louis Émile Boudier who classified it as Lepiota tenella accompanied with illustrations of the species. It was reclassified as Leucocoprinus tenellus in 1943 by the French mycologist Marcel Locquin.

In 1983 the British mycologist David Pegler described another species as Leucocoprinus tenellus however this was an illegitimate name and was reclassified by the mycologist Jaime Bernardo Blanco-Dios in 2020 as Leucocoprinus martinicensis.

In 2012 the German mycologist E.Ludw. described Leucocoprinus emilei however Species Fungorum notes this as an illegitimate name which was based on the basionym Lepiota tenella. It is therefore considered a synonym of Leucocoprinus tenellus.

== Description ==
Leucocoprinus tenellus is a small dapperling mushroom with thin white flesh. Boudier provides the following description of the species:

Cap: Starts campanulate (bell shaped) and covered in woolly (floccose) violet scales before expanding and becoming white with small violet scales clustered in the centre disk and only sparsely dotted across the rest of the surface. The cap edges are striated. Gills: Free and white. Stem: 5-7cm tall (including the cap) tapering up from a slightly bulbous base. The interior is hollow whilst the exterior surface is white above the membranous stem ring, which is located towards the middle of the stem (median), with violet woolly scales below the ring and towards the base. Spores: Ovoid. 12-14 x 7-8 μm.

Whilst Boudier describes the colour as violet in the original text his illustration appears more brown. This may be due to aging and yellowing of the paper (colour corrected on the yellow channel in the following image), fading of the pigment over time or over-saturation in the scanned version of the book. Alternatively his description of the species as violet may simply be down to his own impression of the colour of this mushroom since Leucocoprinus ianthius can present with violet-brown tones which are described differently by different authors.

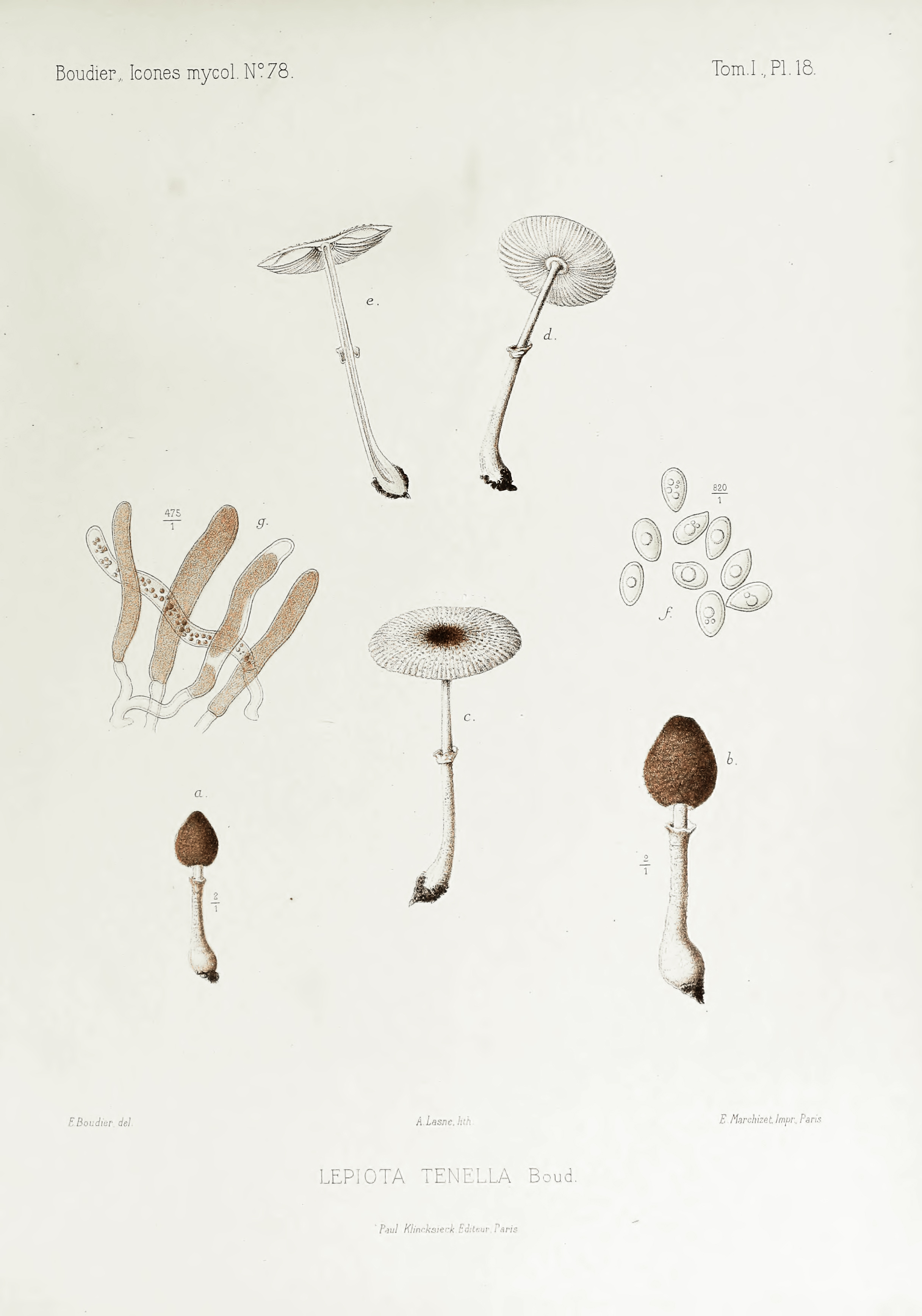
Émile Boudier's illustration, 1905–1910

== Habitat and distribution ==
L. tenellus is scarcely recorded and little known and it is possible that it is a synonym for another Leucocoprinus species which simply has not been reclassified yet.

The specimen studied by Boudier was found in a greenhouse in Montmorency, France.

== Similar species ==
Boudier states that the species is similar to Lepiota bebrissoni [sic] (now known as Leucocoprinus brebissonii) and Lepiota serena (now known as Leucoagaricus serenus) but distinct from these species due to its colour and scaly stem base.
