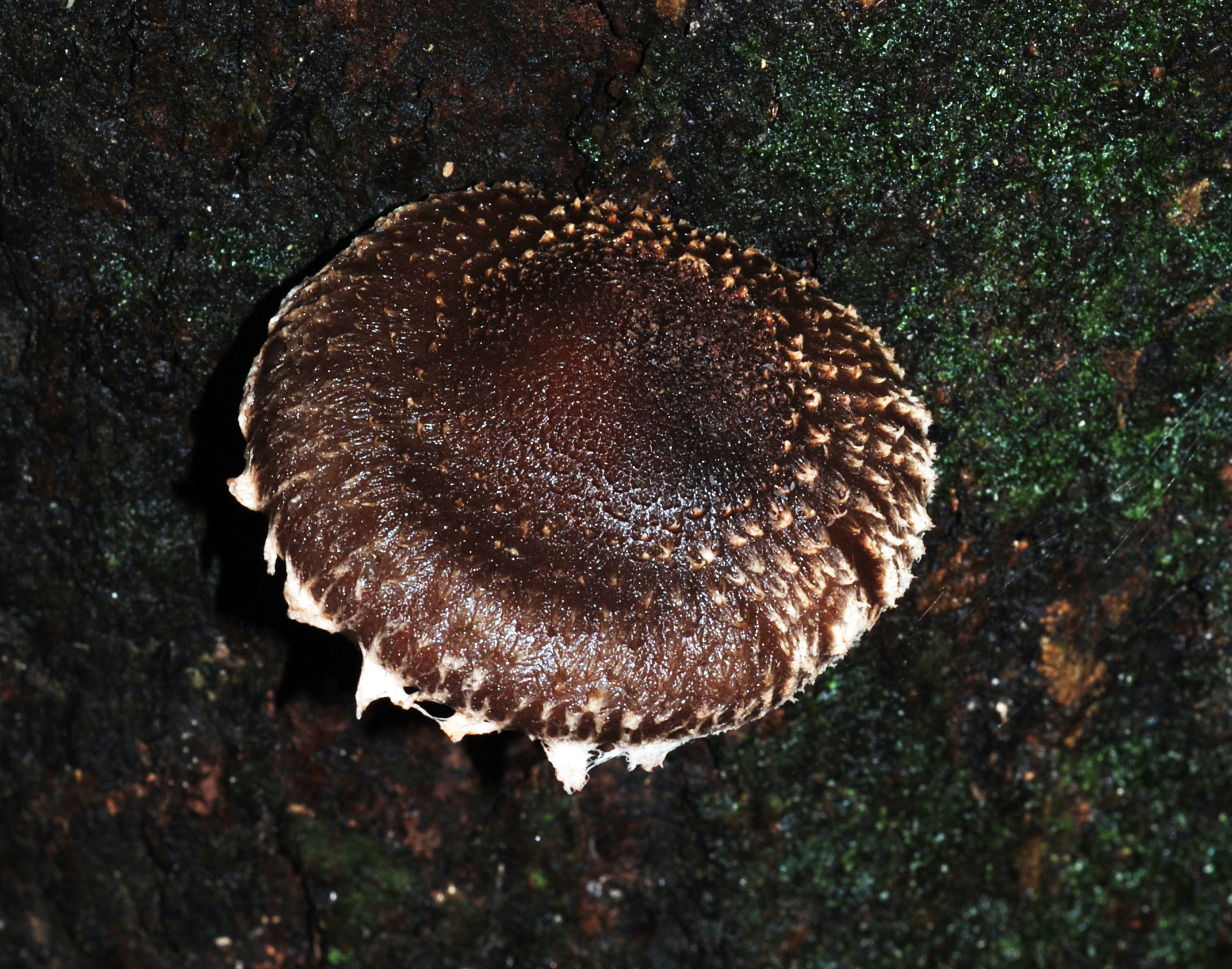

Scientific classification
- Kingdom: Fungi
- Division: Basidiomycota
- Class: Agaricomycetes
- Order: Agaricales
- Family: Omphalotaceae
- Genus: Lentinula
- Species: L. novae-zelandiae

Binomial name
- Lentinula novae-zelandiae (G. Stev.) Pegler, 1983

= Lentinula novae-zelandiae =

Species of fungus

Lentinula novae-zelandiae, also known as New Zealand shiitake, is a species of edible saprobic fungus endemic to New Zealand.

Phylogenetic research suggests this species forms a monophyletic clade of Laurasian origins. It can be cultivated, with cultures and grow kits available commercially in New Zealand.
