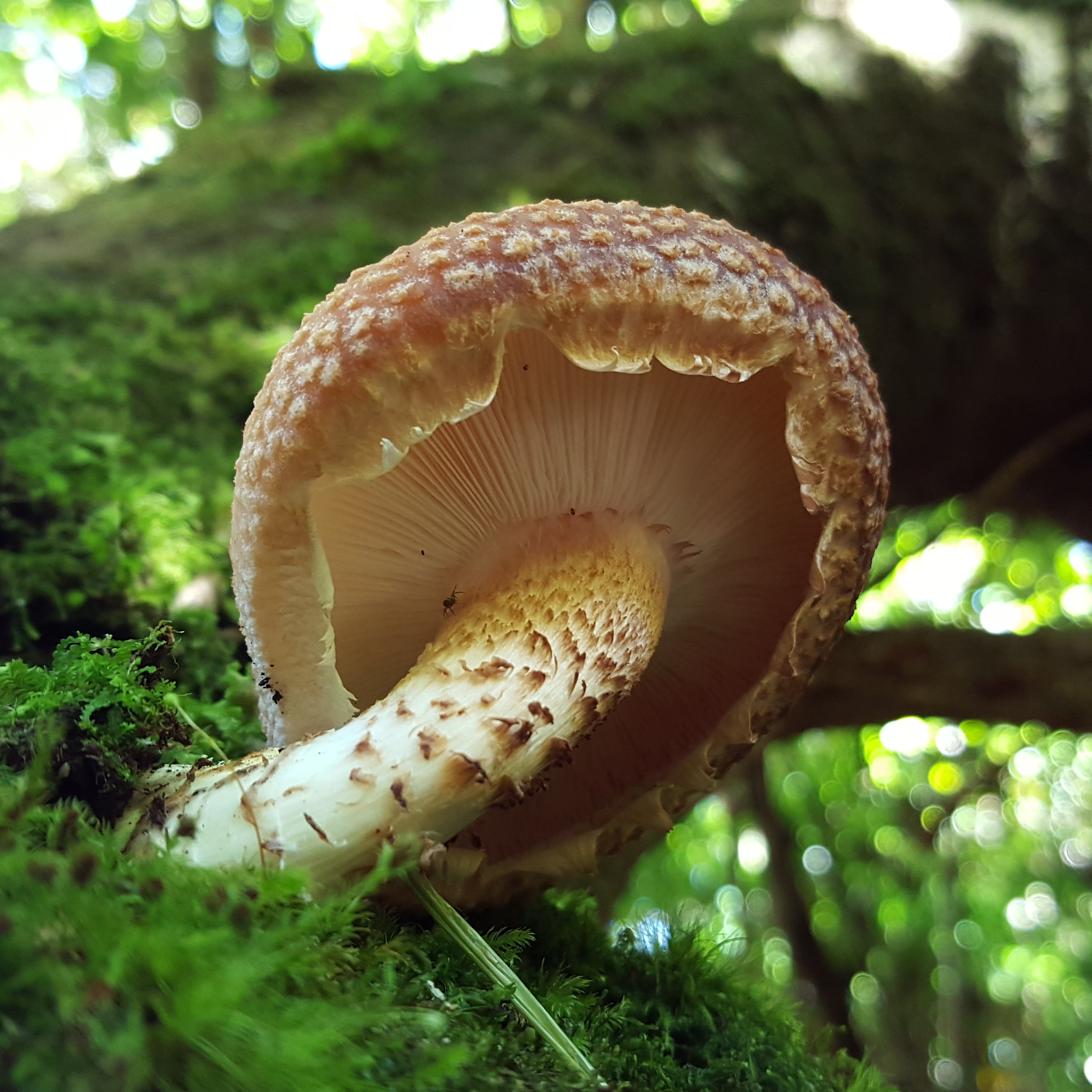
- Lentinula Aciculospora found in Poás Volcano National Park

Scientific classification
- Domain: Eukaryota
- Kingdom: Fungi
- Division: Basidiomycota
- Class: Agaricomycetes
- Order: Agaricales
- Family: Omphalotaceae
- Genus: Lentinula
- Species: L. aciculospora

Binomial name
- Lentinula aciculospora J.L.Mata & R.H.Petersen (2001)

= Lentinula aciculospora =

Species of fungus

Lentinula aciculospora is a species of agaric fungus in the family Omphalotaceae. Described as new to science in 2001, it is known only from Costa Rica, where it grows on oak wood. Fruitbodies are similar in external appearance to others members of the genus Lentinula (including shiitake), but L. aciculospora can be distinguished from those species microscopically by its distinctive elongated, cylindrical spores.
