= Peglerochaete =

Scientific classification
- Kingdom: Fungi
- Division: Basidiomycota
- Class: Agaricomycetes
- Order: Agaricales
- Family: Tricholomataceae
- Genus: Peglerochaete; Sarwal & Locq.

Type species
- Peglerochaete setiger Sarwal & Locq.

Genus of fungi

Peglerochaete is a genus of fungi in the family Tricholomataceae. This is a monotypic genus, containing the single species Peglerochaete setiger, found in the Indian state Sikkim and reported as new to science in 1983.

The genus name of Pegleromyces is in honour of David Pegler (b.1938), who is a British mycologist.

== See also ==
- List of Tricholomataceae genera
