= Lentinula reticeps =

Scientific classification
- Kingdom: Fungi
- Division: Basidiomycota
- Class: Agaricomycetes
- Order: Agaricales
- Family: Omphalotaceae
- Genus: Lentinula
- Species: L. reticeps

Binomial name
- Lentinula reticeps (Mont.) Murrill (1915)

Synonyms
- Agaricus reticeps Mont. (1856); Clitocybe reticeps (Mont.) Sacc. (1887)

Species of fungus

Lentinula reticeps is a species of agaric fungus in the family Omphalotaceae. It was originally described as Agaricus reticeps by French mycologist Camille Montagne in 1856. William Alphonso Murrill transferred it to the genus Lentinula in 1915.
