= Pegleromyces =

Scientific classification
- Kingdom: Fungi
- Division: Basidiomycota
- Class: Agaricomycetes
- Order: Agaricales
- Family: Tricholomataceae
- Genus: Pegleromyces (Singer)

Type species
- Pegleromyces collybioides Singer

Genus of fungi

Pegleromyces is a genus of fungi in the family Tricholomataceae. It is a monotypic genus, containing the single species Pegleromyces collybioides, found in Brazil, and described as new to science by mycologist Rolf Singer in 1981.

The genus name of Pegleromyces is in honour of David Pegler (b.1938), who is a British mycologist.

== See also ==
- List of Tricholomataceae genera
