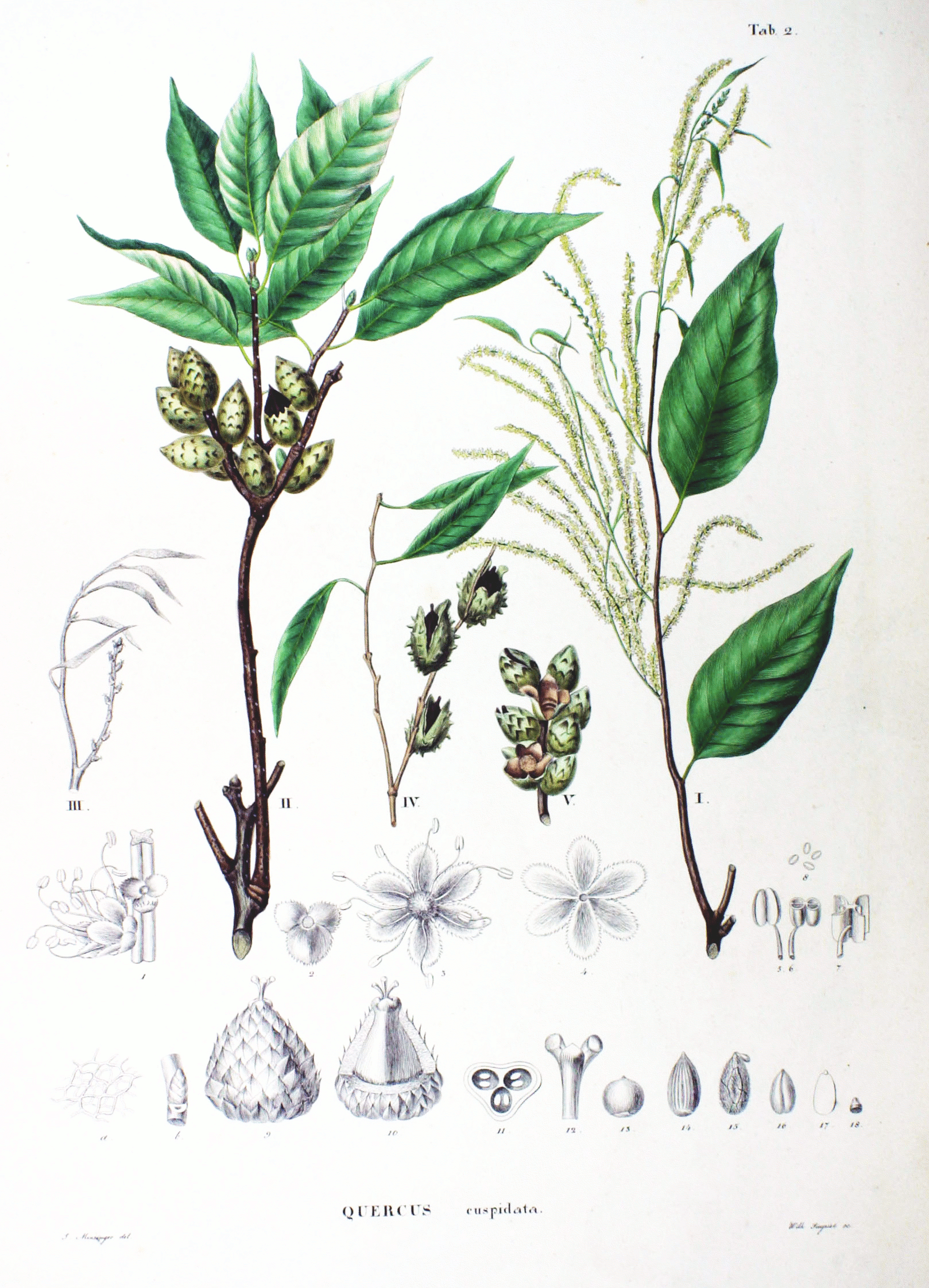

Conservation status
- Least Concern (IUCN 3.1)

Scientific classification
- Kingdom: Plantae
- Clade: Tracheophytes
- Clade: Angiosperms
- Clade: Eudicots
- Clade: Rosids
- Order: Fagales
- Family: Fagaceae
- Genus: Castanopsis
- Species: C. cuspidata

Binomial name
- Castanopsis cuspidata (Thunb.) Schottky

Synonyms
- Pasania cuspidata (Thunb.) Oerst. Pasaniopsis cuspidata (Thunb.) Kudô; Quercus cuspidata Thunb.

= Castanopsis cuspidata =

Species of tree

Castanopsis cuspidata (Japanese chinquapin; Japanese tsuburajii, 円椎) is a species of Castanopsis native to southern Japan and southern Korea.

It is a medium-sized evergreen tree growing to 20–30 m tall, related to beech and oak. The leaves are 5–9 cm long and 2–4 cm broad, leathery in texture, with an entire or irregularly toothed margin. It grows in woods and ravines, especially near the sea.

The cotyledon of the nut is eaten boiled or roasted.

Its dead wood serves as host to many mushroom types, most notably the shiitake, whose Japanese name (椎茸) is composed of shii (椎, the Castanopsis tree), and take (茸; "mushroom").

== Gallery ==
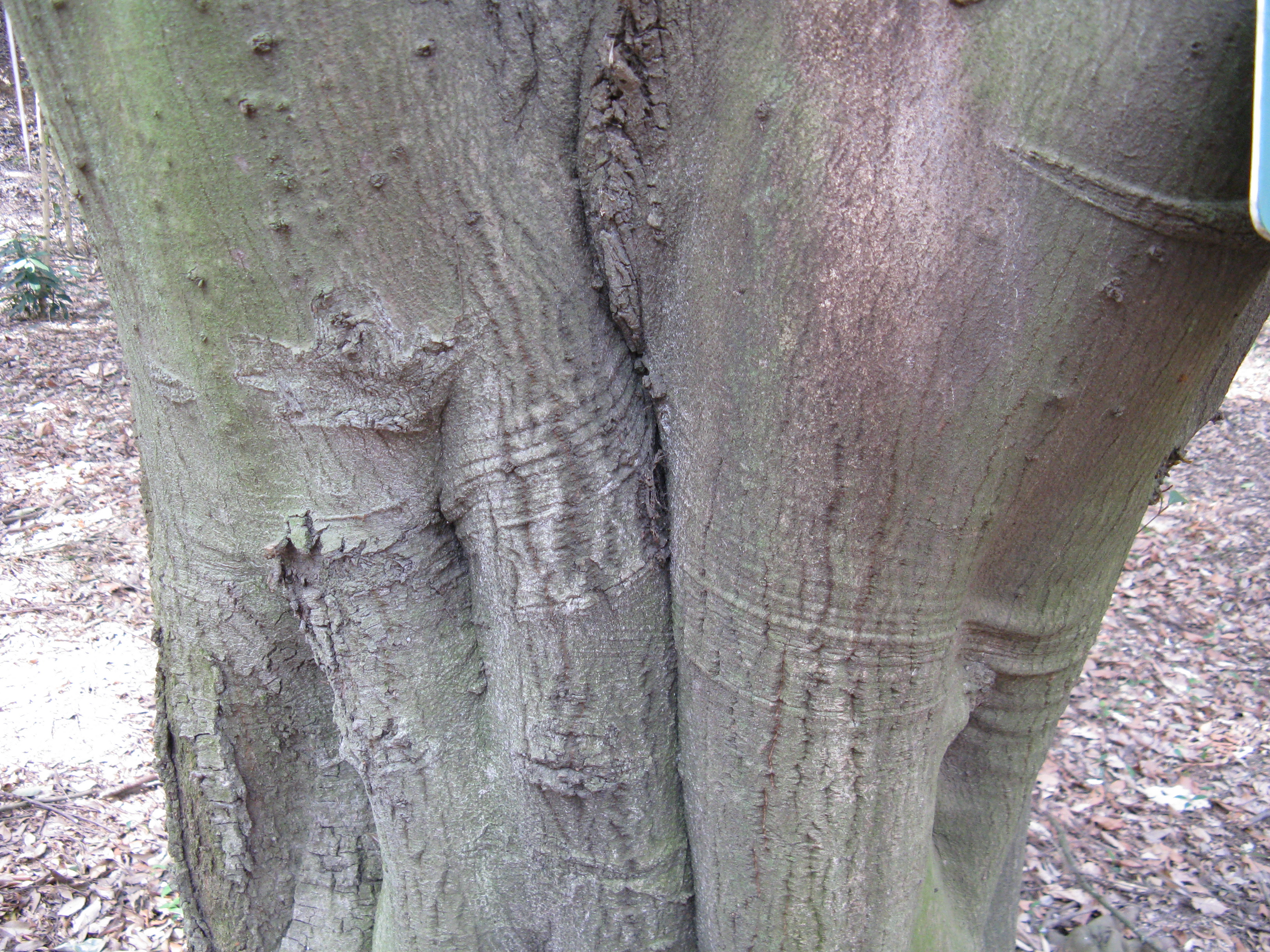
Bark of base of mature tree

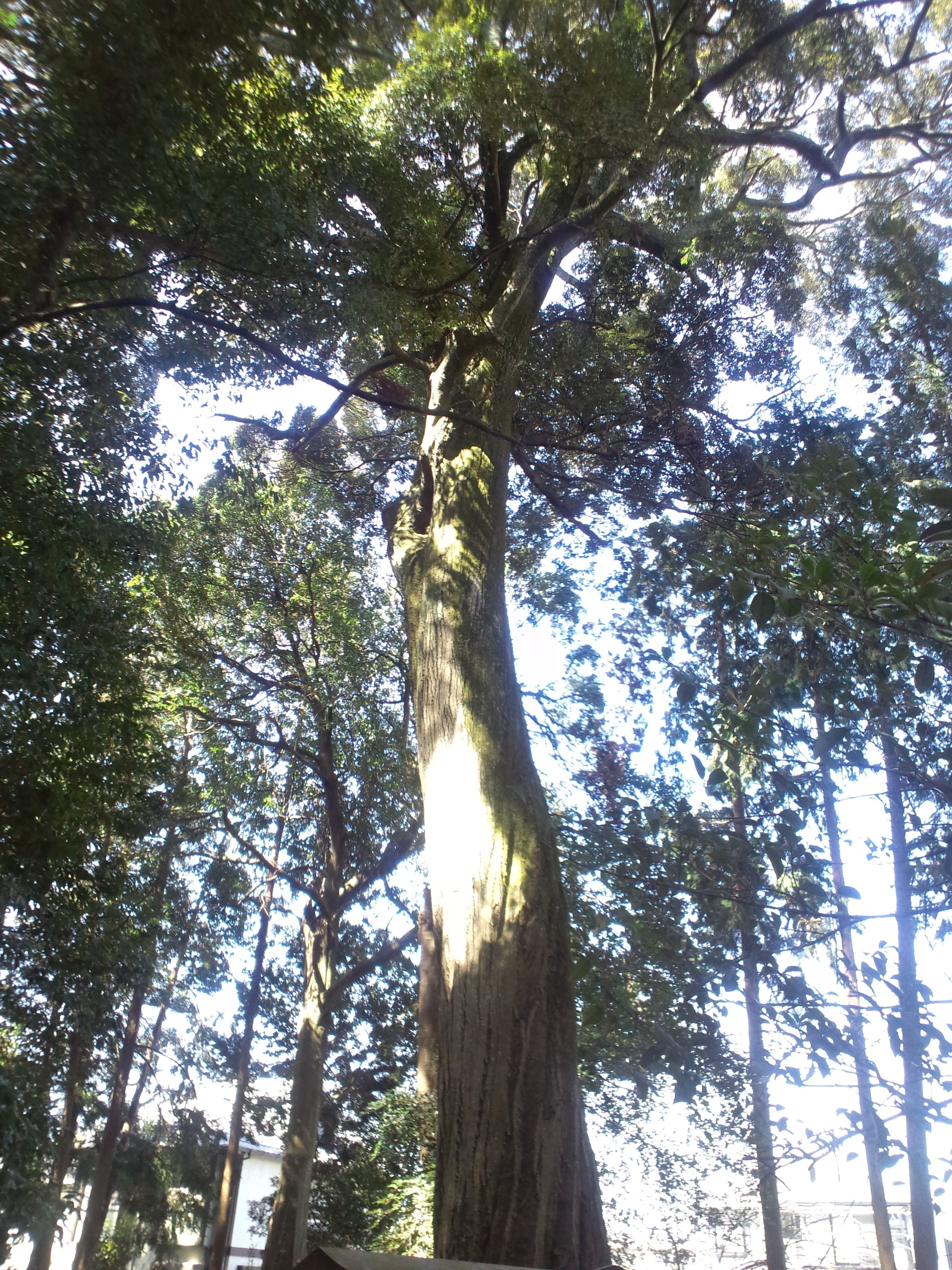
Tall trunk of mature tree

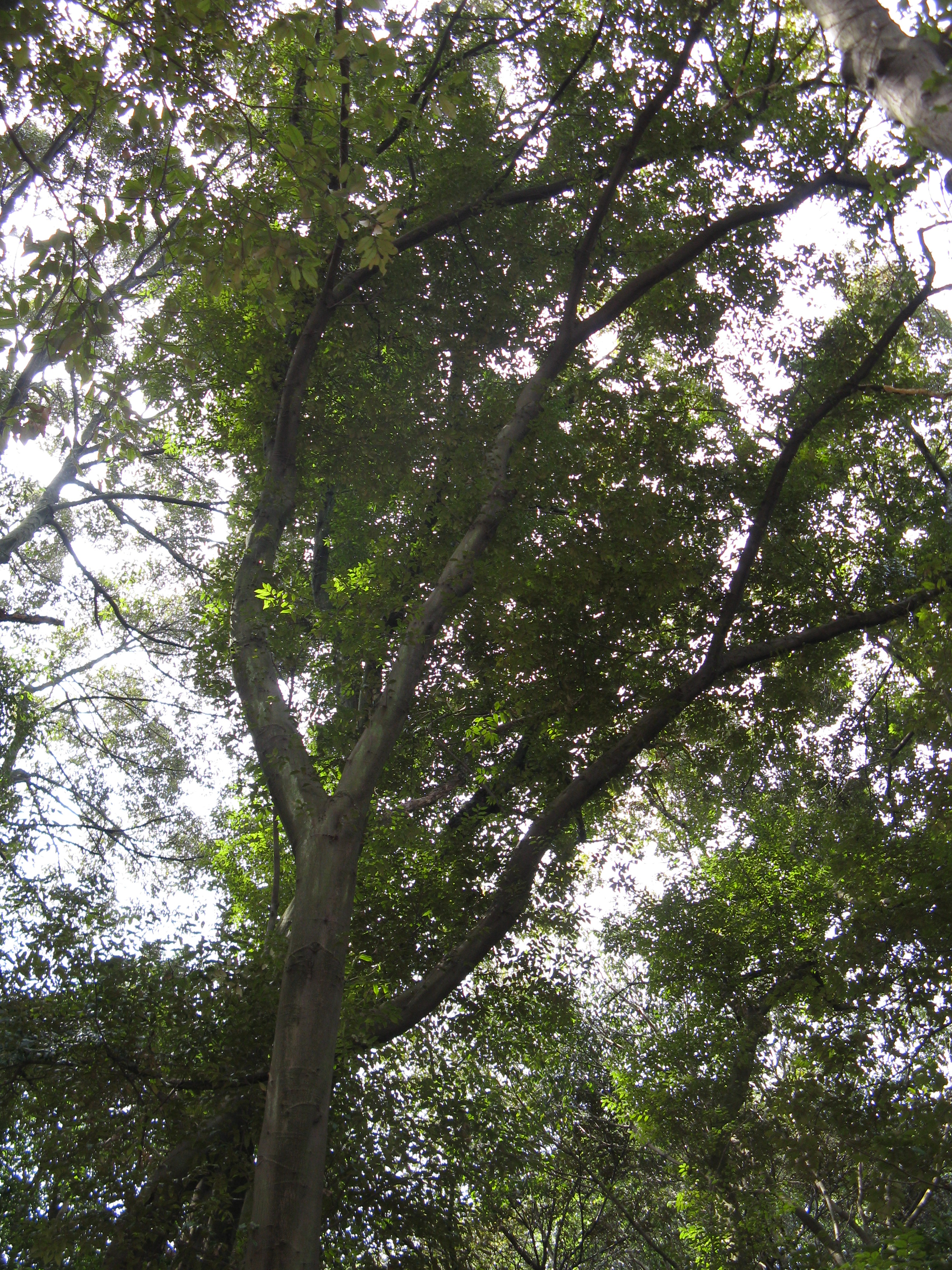
Slender, fountain-like canopy of mature specimen, viewed from beneath

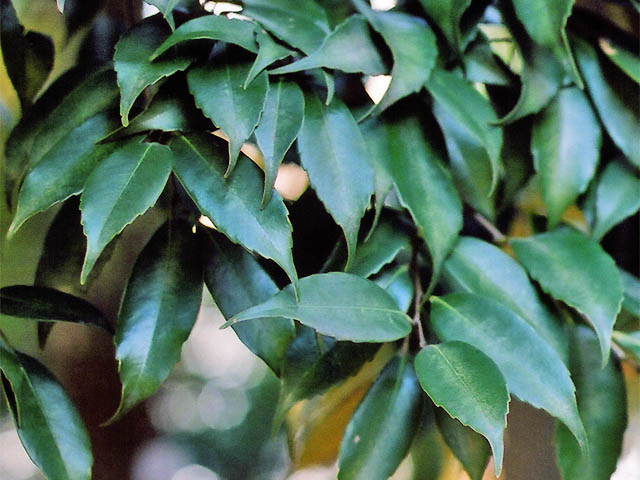
Mature, deep green leaves

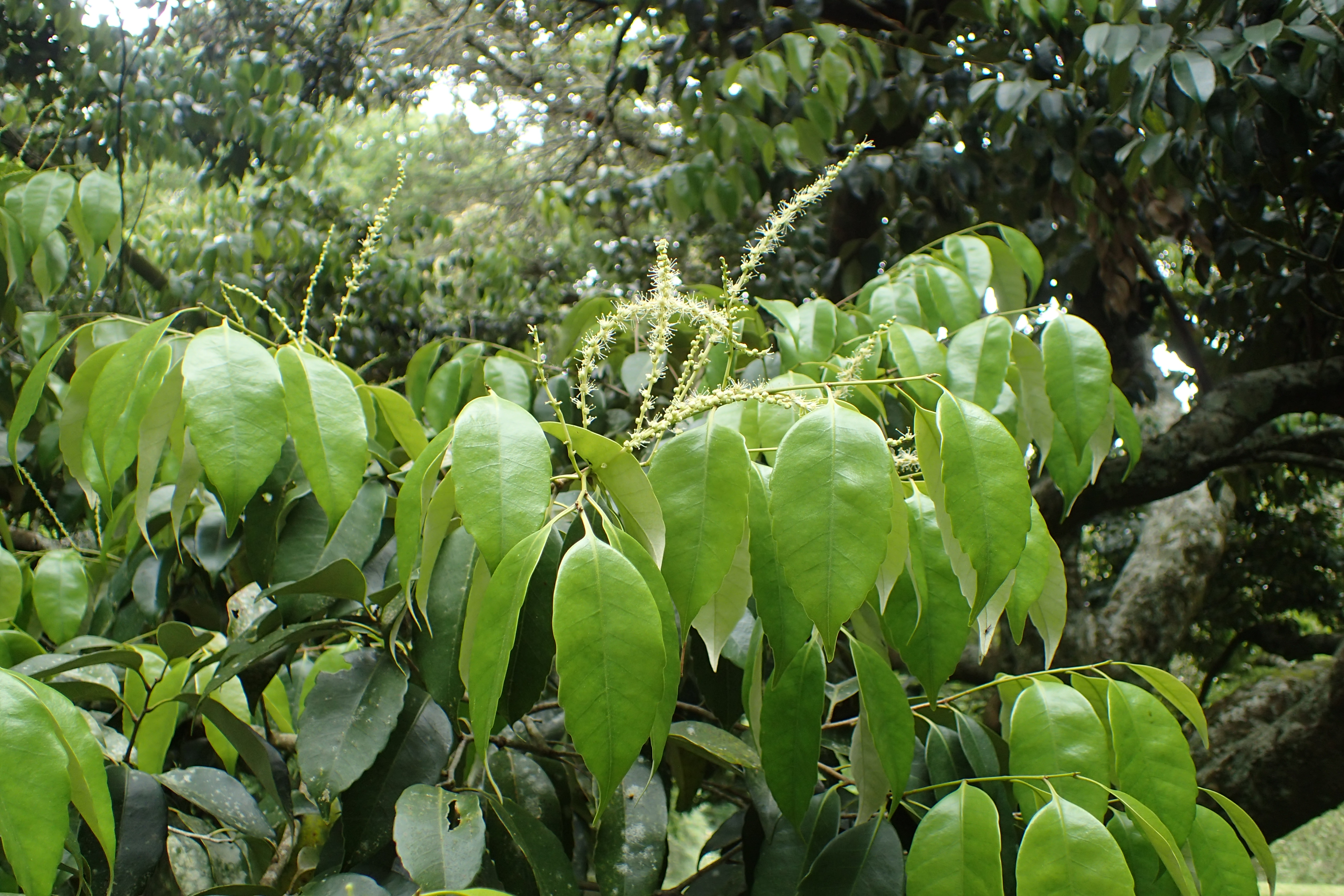
Flowering shoots

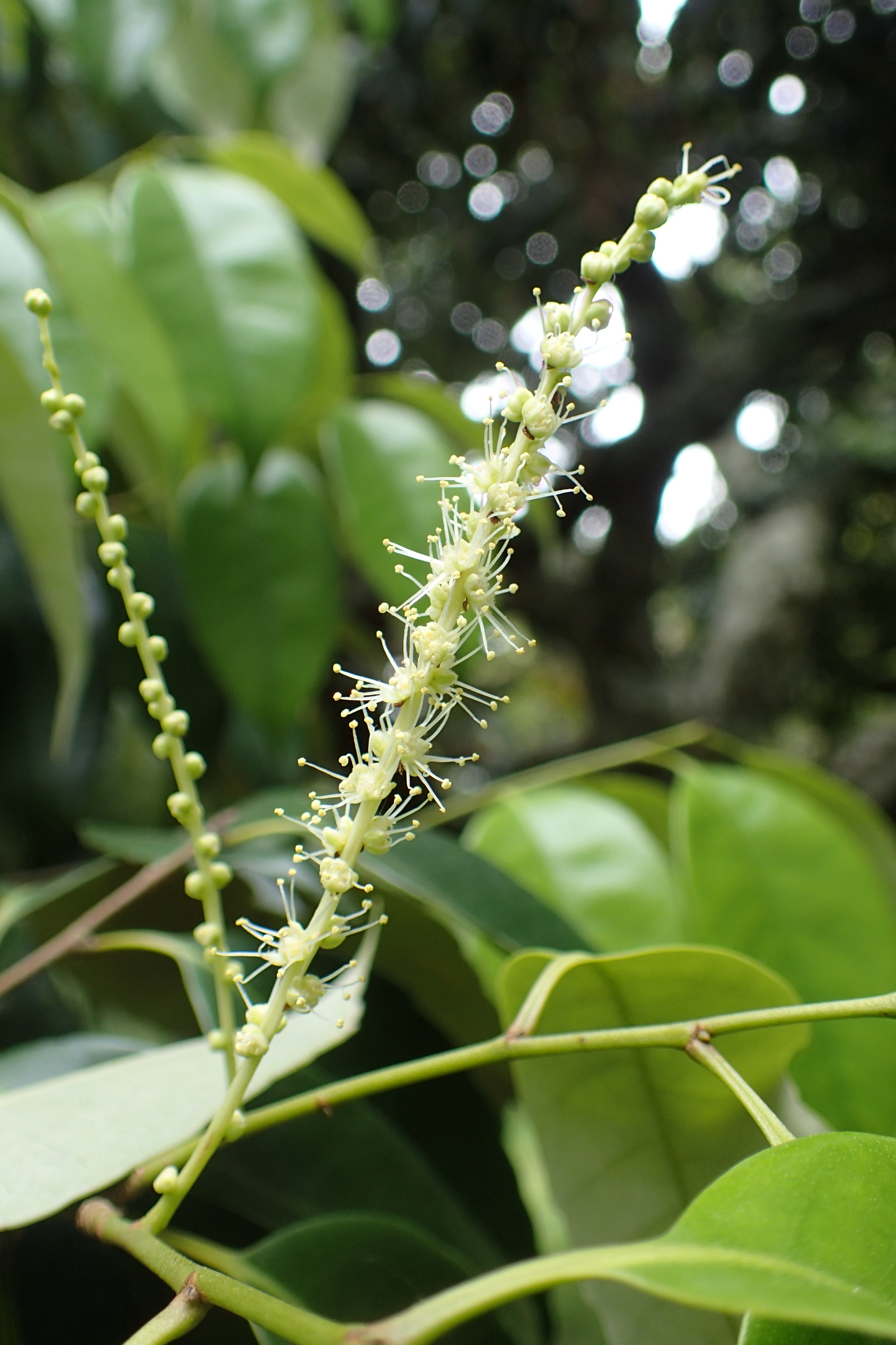
Closeup of slender inflorescences

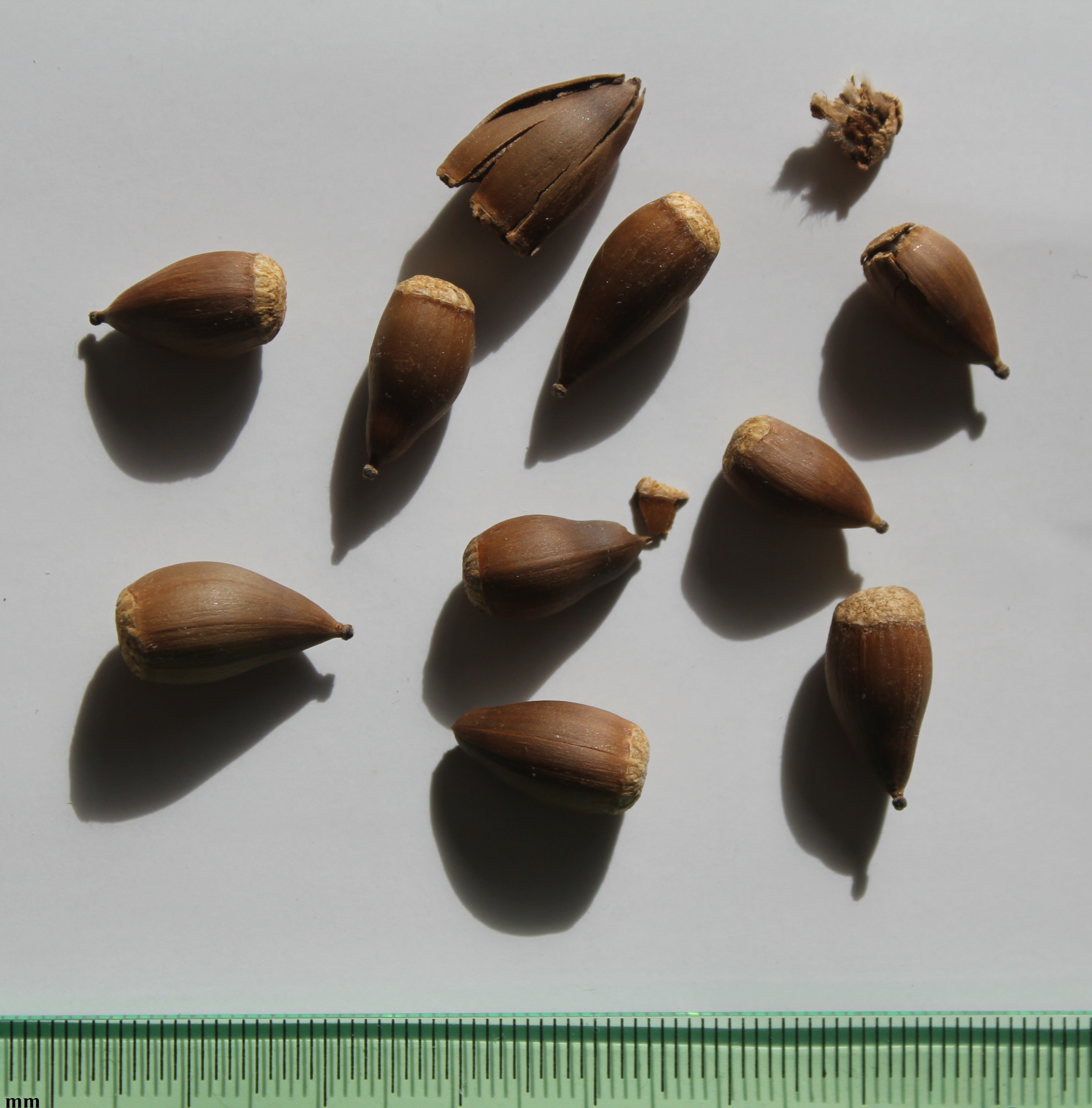
Edible seeds/nuts

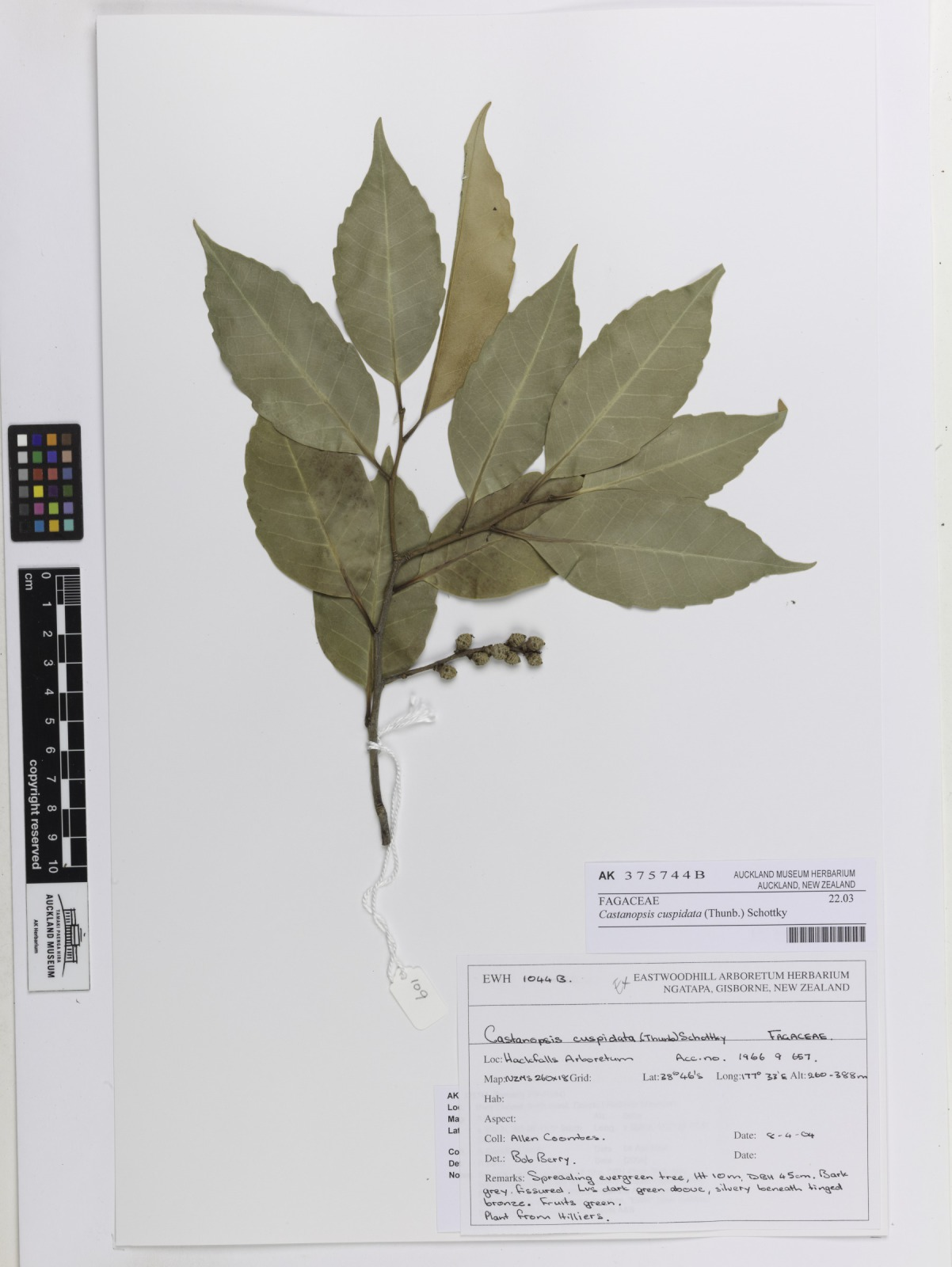
Preserved specimen from herbarium, with descriptive notes

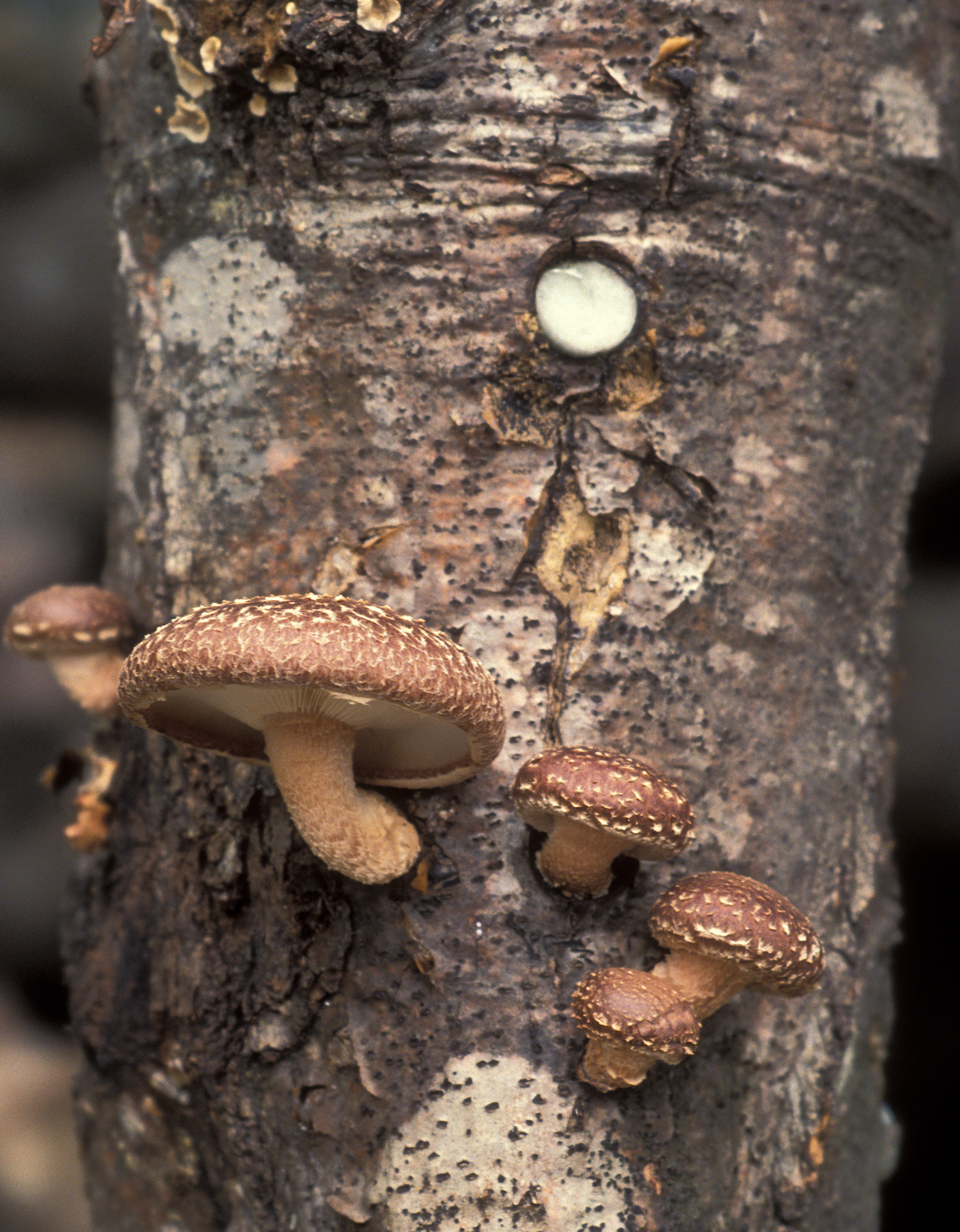
Dead trunk, with fruiting bodies of shiitake
