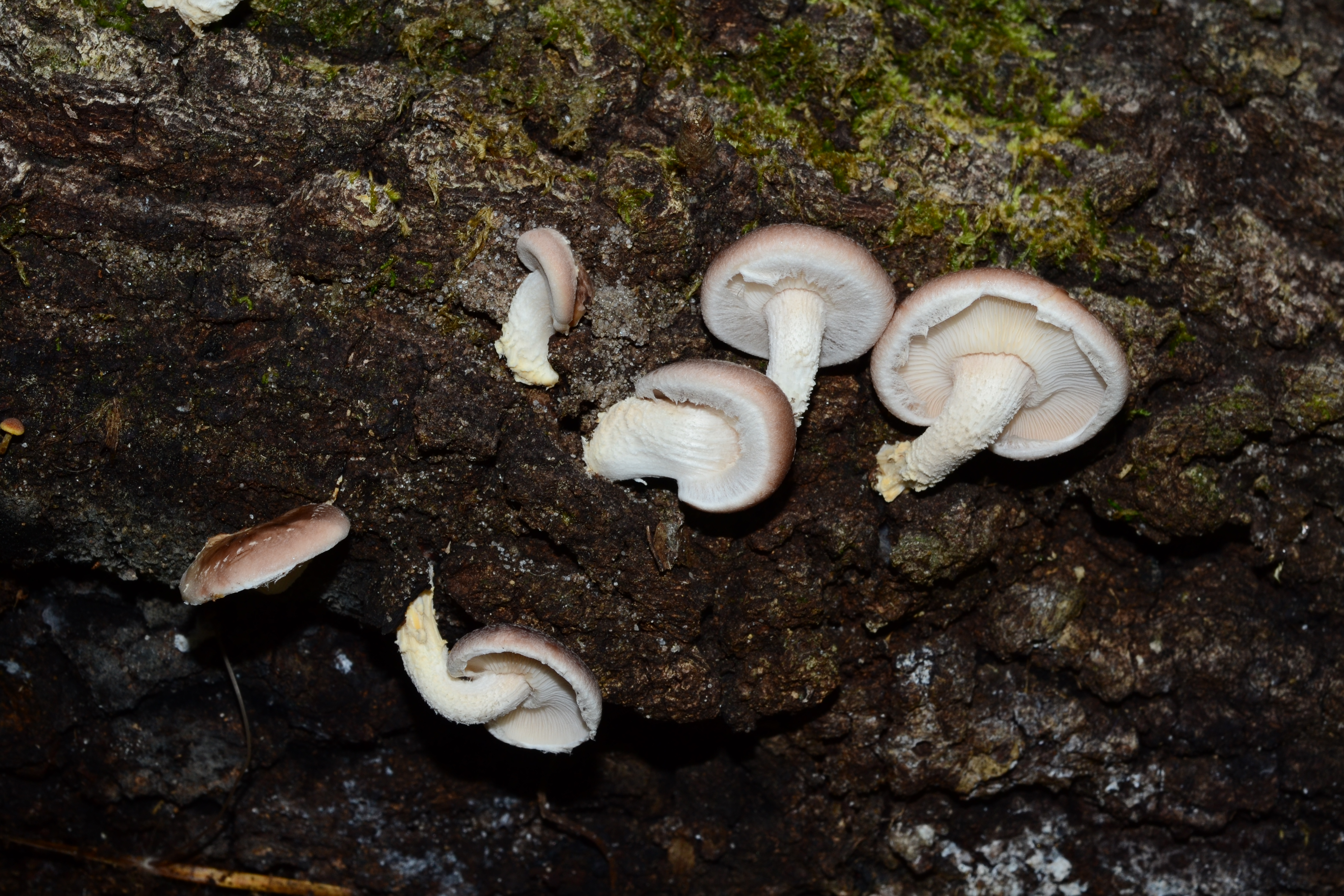

Conservation status
- Least Concern (IUCN 3.1)

Scientific classification
- Kingdom: Fungi
- Division: Basidiomycota
- Class: Agaricomycetes
- Order: Agaricales
- Family: Omphalotaceae
- Genus: Lentinula
- Species: L. raphanica

Binomial name
- Lentinula raphanica (Murrill) J.L.Mata & R.H.Petersen (2001)

Synonyms
- Armillaria raphanica Gymnopus alliaceus

= Lentinula raphanica =

Species of fungus

Lentinula raphanica is a species of edible agaric fungus in the family Omphalotaceae. Described as two species, Armillaria raphanica and Gymnopus alliaceus by William Alphonso Murrill in 1943, they have been moved to a single species of the genus Lentinula by Ron Petersen and J. L. Mata in 2001.

The convex caps are up to 7.5 centimetres (3 in) wide, pale with yellowish blotches. The stem is up to 8 cm (3 1/4 in) long. The spore print is white. The fruitbodies are similar in external appearance to others members of the genus Lentinula (including the shiitake, L. edodes), being distinguished by gills and smell reminiscent of radish or alliums, especially while drying.

It is known from the American subtropics, including the Gulf Coast and Brazil, where it grows on hardwood logs.

It is eaten by the Witoto and Andoque people in Colombia and the Yanomami in Brazil, with Yanomani calling it Naönaö amo in Sanumá language and serving it boiled with broth and beiju cakes.
