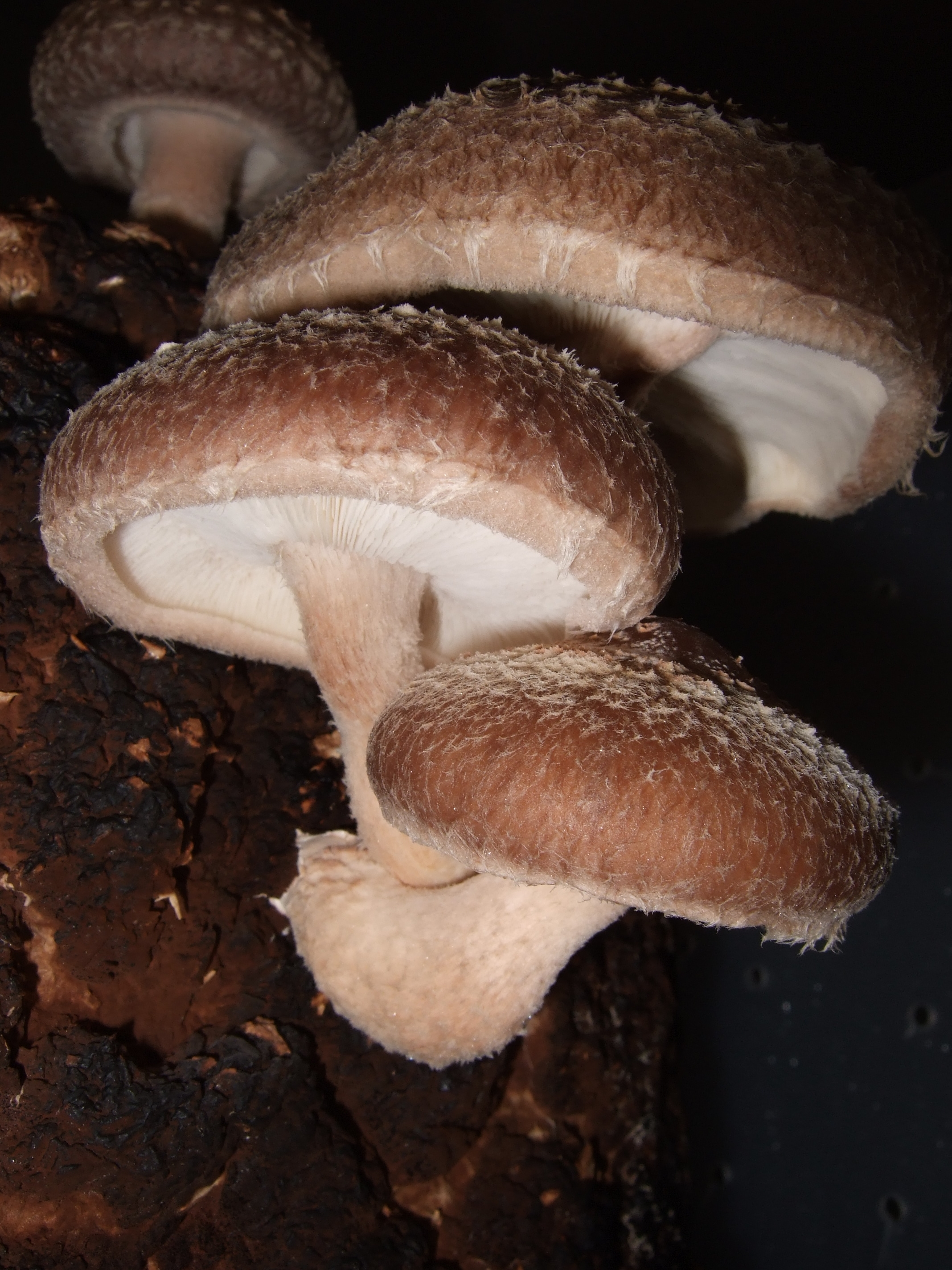

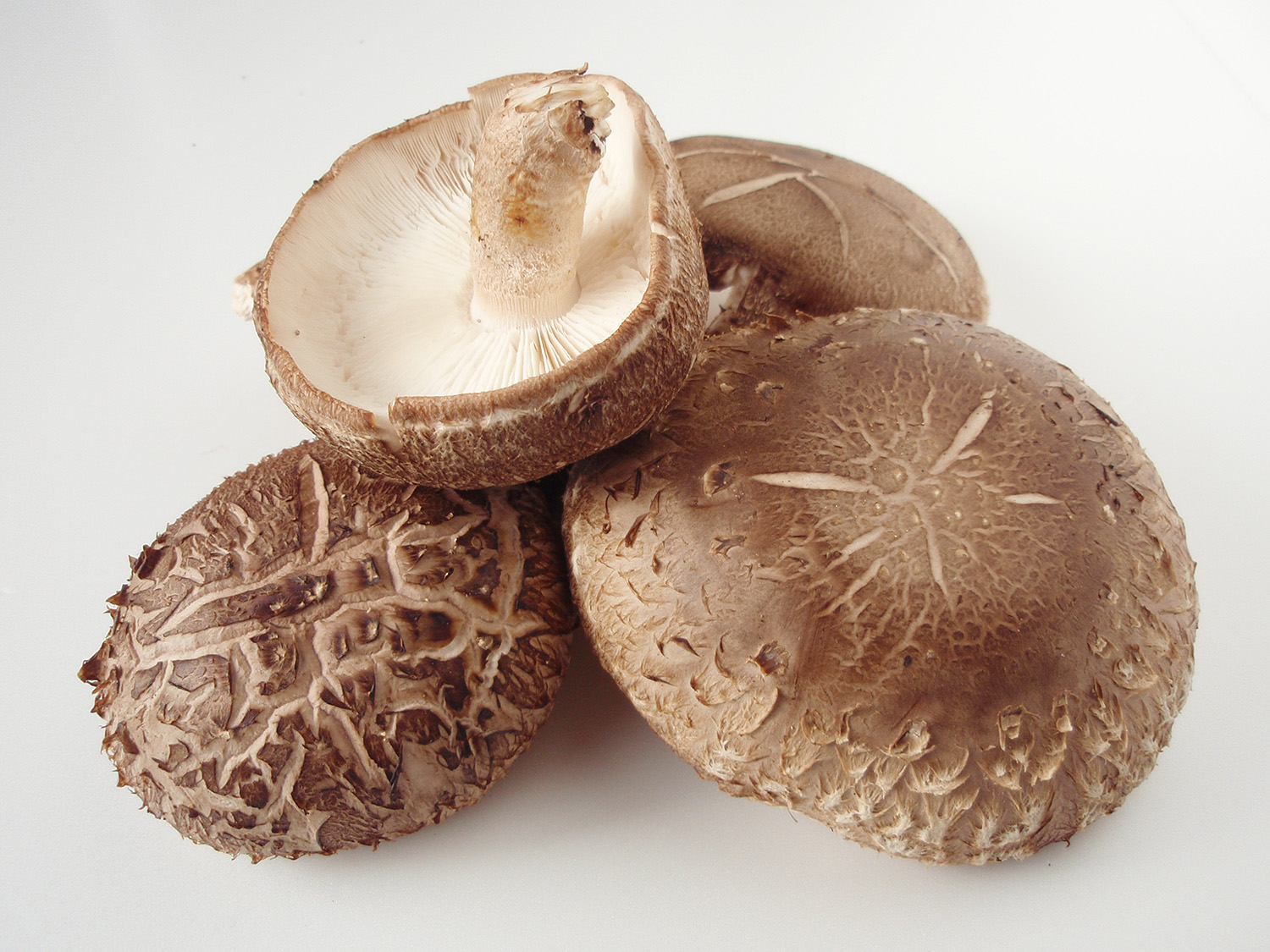

Scientific classification
- Kingdom: Fungi
- Division: Basidiomycota
- Class: Agaricomycetes
- Order: Agaricales
- Family: Omphalotaceae
- Genus: Lentinula
- Species: L. edodes

Binomial name
- Lentinula edodes (Berk.) Pegler (1976)

= Shiitake =

Species of edible mushroom

Lentinula edodes
- Mycological characteristics
- Gills on hymenium
- Cap is convex
- Hymenium is free
- Stipe is bare
- Spore print is white to buff
- Ecology is saprotrophic
- Edibility is choice

Shiitake

Chinese name
- Traditional Chinese: 香菇
- Simplified Chinese: 香菇
- Hanyu Pinyin: xiānggū
Transcriptions
Standard Mandarin
- Hanyu Pinyin: xiānggū

Vietnamese name
- Vietnamese: nấm hương

Thai name
- Thai: เห็ดหอม (hèt hŏm)

Korean name
- Hangul: 표고
- Hanja: 蔈菰
Transcriptions
- Revised Romanization: pyogo

Japanese name
- Kanji: 椎茸 or 香蕈
- Hiragana: しいたけ

The shiitake (/ʃɪˈtɑːkeɪ, ˌʃiːɪ-, -ki/; Japanese: [ɕiꜜːtake] Chinese mushroom, black mushroom, Lentinula edodes or sometimes Lentinus edodes) is an edible mushroom native to East Asia and mainland Southeast Asia, which is cultivated and consumed around the globe. The earliest written records of their cultivation dates to 1209, during the Song dynasty in China.

== Taxonomy ==
The fungus was first described scientifically as Agaricus edodes by Miles Joseph Berkeley in 1877. It was placed in the genus Lentinula by David Pegler in 1976. The fungus has acquired an extensive synonymy in its taxonomic history:

- Agaricus edodes Berk. (1878)
- Armillaria edodes (Berk.) Sacc. (1887)
- Mastoleucomychelloes edodes (Berk.) Kuntze (1891)
- Cortinellus edodes (Berk.) S.Ito & S.Imai (1938)
- Lentinus edodes (Berk.) Singer (1941)
- Collybia shiitake J.Schröt. (1886)
- Lepiota shiitake (J.Schröt.) Nobuj. Tanaka (1889)
- Cortinellus shiitake (J.Schröt.) Henn. (1899)
- Tricholoma shiitake (J.Schröt.) Lloyd (1918)
- Lentinus shiitake (J.Schröt.) Singer (1936)
- Lentinus tonkinensis Pat. (1890)
- Lentinus mellianus Lohwag (1918)

The mushroom's Japanese name shiitake (椎茸) is a compound word composed of shii (椎, Castanopsis), for the tree Castanopsis cuspidata that provides the dead logs on which it is typically cultivated, and take (茸; "mushroom"). The specific epithet edodes is the Latin word for "edible".

It is also commonly called "sawtooth oak mushroom", "black forest mushroom", "black mushroom", "golden oak mushroom", or "oakwood mushroom".

== Distribution and habitat ==
Shiitake grow in groups on the decaying wood of deciduous trees, particularly shii and other chinquapins, chestnut, oak, maple, beech, sweetgum, poplar, hornbeam, ironwood, and mulberry. Its natural distribution includes warm and moist climates in Southeast Asia.

== Cultivation ==
The earliest written record of shiitake cultivation is seen in the Records of Longquan County (龍泉縣志) compiled by He Zhan (何澹) in 1209 during the Song dynasty in China. The 185-word description of shiitake cultivation from that literature was later cross-referenced many times and eventually adapted in a book by a Japanese horticulturist Satō Chūryō (佐藤中陵) in 1796, the first book on shiitake cultivation in Japan. The Japanese cultivated the mushroom by cutting shii trees with axes and placing the logs by trees that were already growing shiitake or contained shiitake spores. Before 1982, the Japan Islands' variety of these mushrooms could only be grown in traditional locations using ancient methods. A 1982 report on the budding and growth of the Japanese variety revealed opportunities for commercial cultivation in the United States.

Shiitake are widely cultivated worldwide, contributing about 25% of the total yearly production of mushrooms. Commercially, shiitake mushrooms are typically grown in conditions similar to their natural environment on either artificial substrate or hardwood logs, such as oak.

== Toxicity ==
Rarely, consumption of raw or slightly cooked shiitake mushrooms may cause an allergic reaction called "shiitake dermatitis", including an erythematous, micro-papular, streaky pruriginous rash that occurs all over the body including face and scalp, appearing about 24 hours after consumption, possibly worsening by sun exposure and disappearing after 3 to 21 days. This effect – presumably caused by lentinan, a polysaccharide – is more common in East Asia, but may be growing in occurrence in Europe as shiitake consumption increases. Thorough cooking may eliminate the allergenicity.

== Uses ==
Mushrooms, shiitake, raw
Nutritional value per 100 g (3.5 oz)
- Energy: 141 kJ (34 kcal)
- Carbohydrates: 6.8 g
- Sugars: 2.4 g
- Dietary fiber: 2.5 g
- Fat: 0.5 g
- Protein: 2.2 g
Vitamins and minerals
Vitamins	Quantity %DV^{†}
Thiamine (B1)	2% 0.02 mg
Riboflavin (B2)	17% 0.22 mg
Niacin (B3)	24% 3.88 mg
Pantothenic acid (B5)	30% 1.5 mg
Vitamin B6	17% 0.29 mg
Folate (B9)	3% 13 μg
Vitamin C	4% 3.5 mg
Vitamin D	2% 0.4 μg
Minerals	Quantity %DV^{†}
Calcium	0% 2 mg
Iron	2% 0.4 mg
Magnesium	5% 20 mg
Manganese	9% 0.2 mg
Phosphorus	9% 112 mg
Potassium	10% 304 mg
Selenium	10% 5.7 μg
Sodium	0% 9 mg
Zinc	9% 1.0 mg
- Other constituents: Quantity
- Water: 89.7 g
- Full Link to USDA Database entry
- ^{†}Percentages estimated using US recommendations for adults, except for potassium, which is estimated based on expert recommendation from the National Academies.

Fresh and dried shiitake have many uses in East and Southeast Asia. In Chinese cuisine, they are used in many dishes, including soups, braises, and stir-fried vegetable dishes such as Buddha's delight. In Japan, they are served in miso soup, used as the basis for a kind of vegetarian dashi, and as an ingredient in many steamed and simmered dishes.

Two prized varieties are produced in cooler temperatures. One high-grade variety is called dōnggū (冬菇) (literally "winter mushroom") in Chinese, or donko (冬子) in Japanese. The most highly prized variety is called huāgū (花菇) (literally "flower mushroom") in Chinese, due to the flower-like pattern of cracks in the cap.

Mushrooms, shiitake, dried
Nutritional value per 100 g (3.5 oz)
- Energy: 1,238 kJ (296 kcal)
- Carbohydrates: 75.37 g
- Sugars: 2.21 g
- Dietary fiber: 11.5 g
- Fat: 0.99 g
- Protein: 9.58 g
Vitamins and minerals
Vitamins	Quantity %DV^{†}
Thiamine (B1)	25% 0.3 mg
Riboflavin (B2)	98% 1.27 mg
Niacin (B3)	88% 14.1 mg
Pantothenic acid (B5)	438% 21.879 mg
Vitamin B6	57% 0.965 mg
Folate (B9)	41% 163 μg
Vitamin C	4% 3.5 mg
Vitamin D	20% 3.9 μg
Minerals	Quantity %DV^{†}
Calcium	1% 11 mg
Iron	10% 1.72 mg
Magnesium	31% 132 mg
Manganese	51% 1.176 mg
Phosphorus	24% 294 mg
Potassium	51% 1534 mg
Selenium	84% 46 μg
Sodium	1% 13 mg
Zinc	70% 7.66 mg
- Other constituents: Quantity
- Water: 9.5 g
- Link to USDA Database entry
- ^{†}Percentages estimated using US recommendations for adults, except for potassium, which is estimated based on expert recommendation from the National Academies.

=== Nutrition ===
Raw shiitake mushrooms are 90% water, 7% carbohydrates, 2% protein, and contain less than 1% fat (table). In a reference amount of 100 grams (3.5 oz), raw shiitake mushrooms provide 34 calories of food energy, and are a source of several B vitamins and some dietary minerals (table).

Like all mushrooms, shiitakes produce vitamin D_{2} upon exposure of their internal ergosterol to ultraviolet B (UVB) rays from sunlight or broadband UVB fluorescent tubes.

== Gallery ==
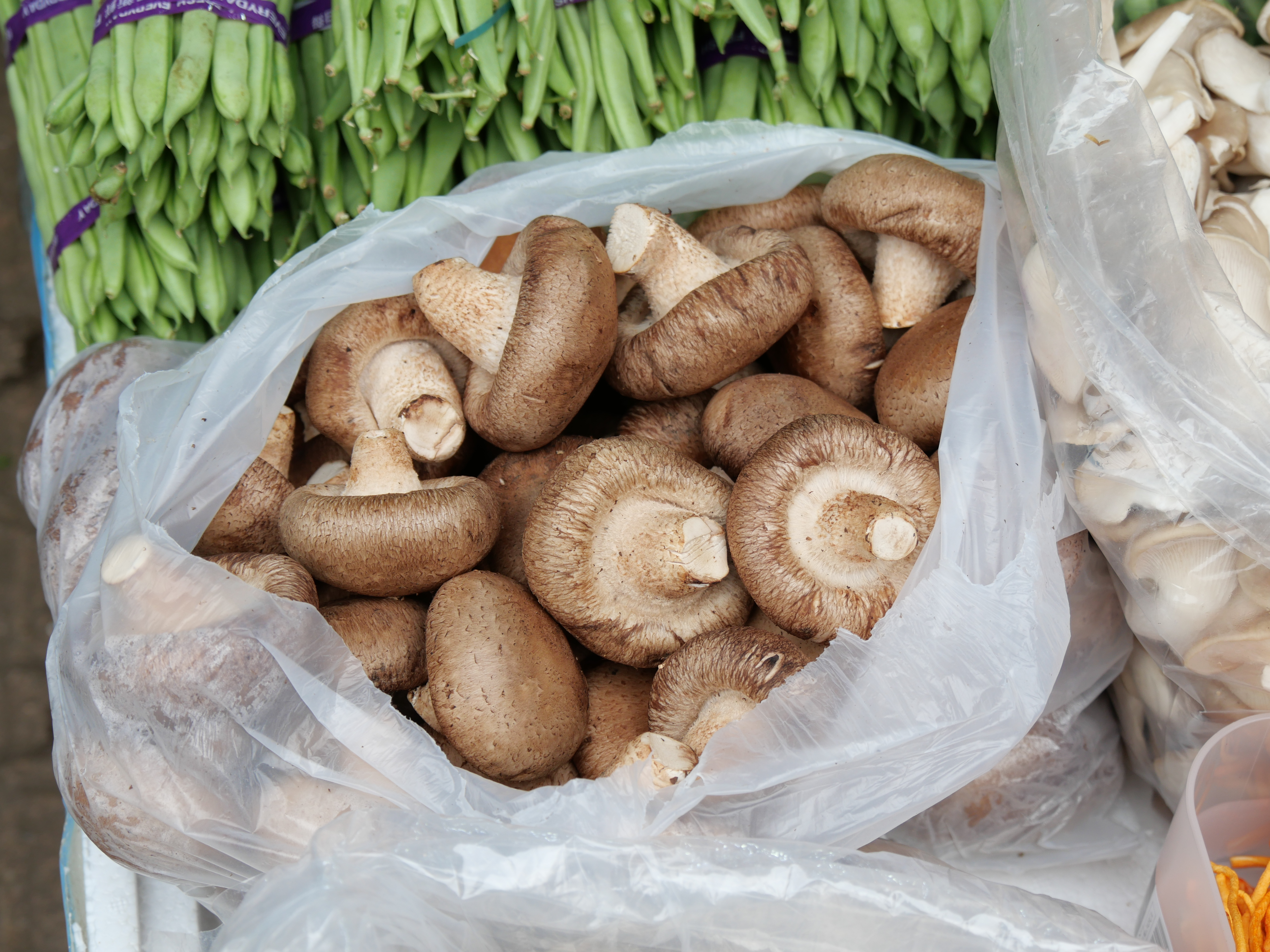
Fresh shiitake mushroom in the vegetable market in Hong Kong

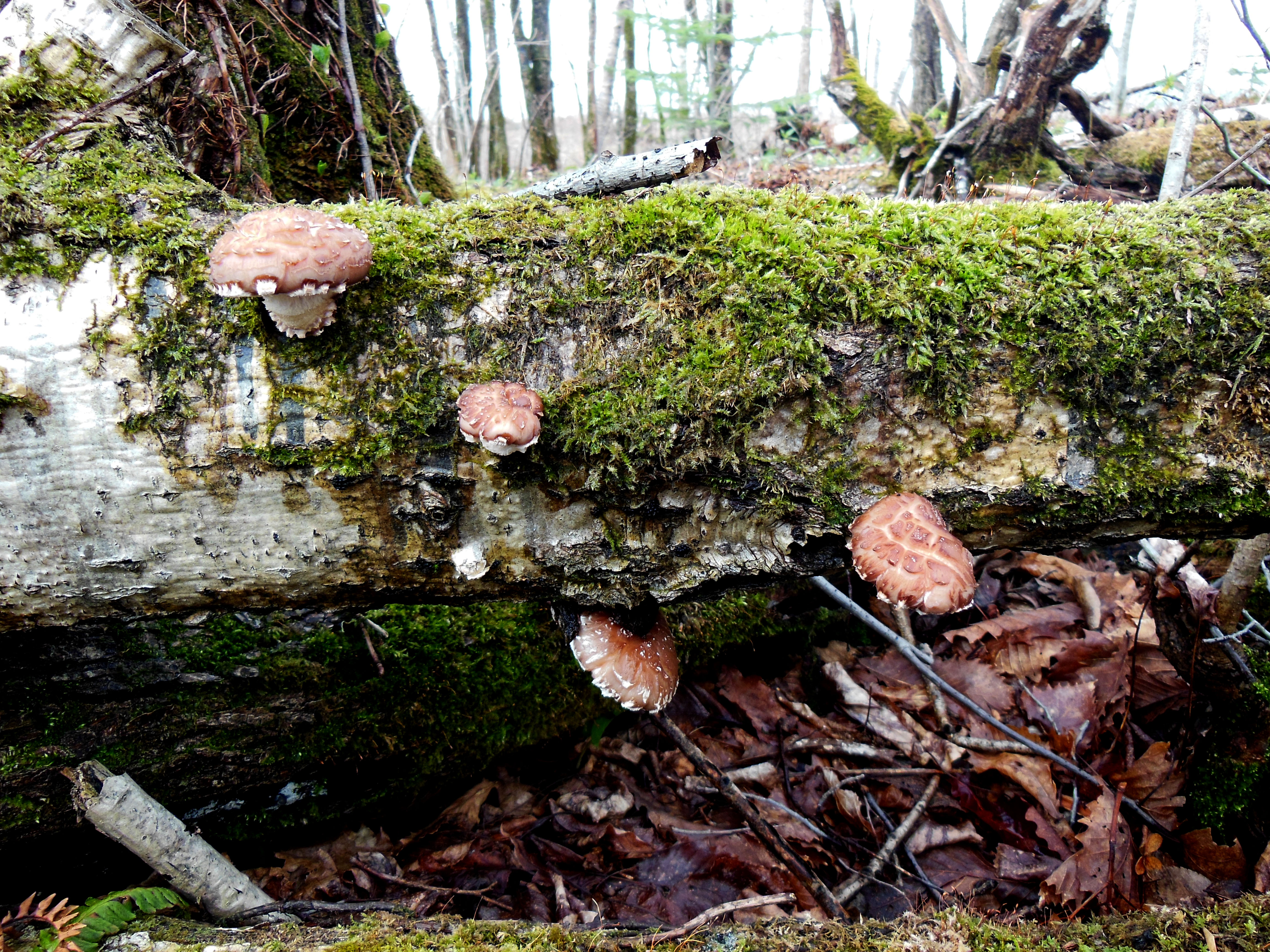
shiitake growing wild in Hokkaido

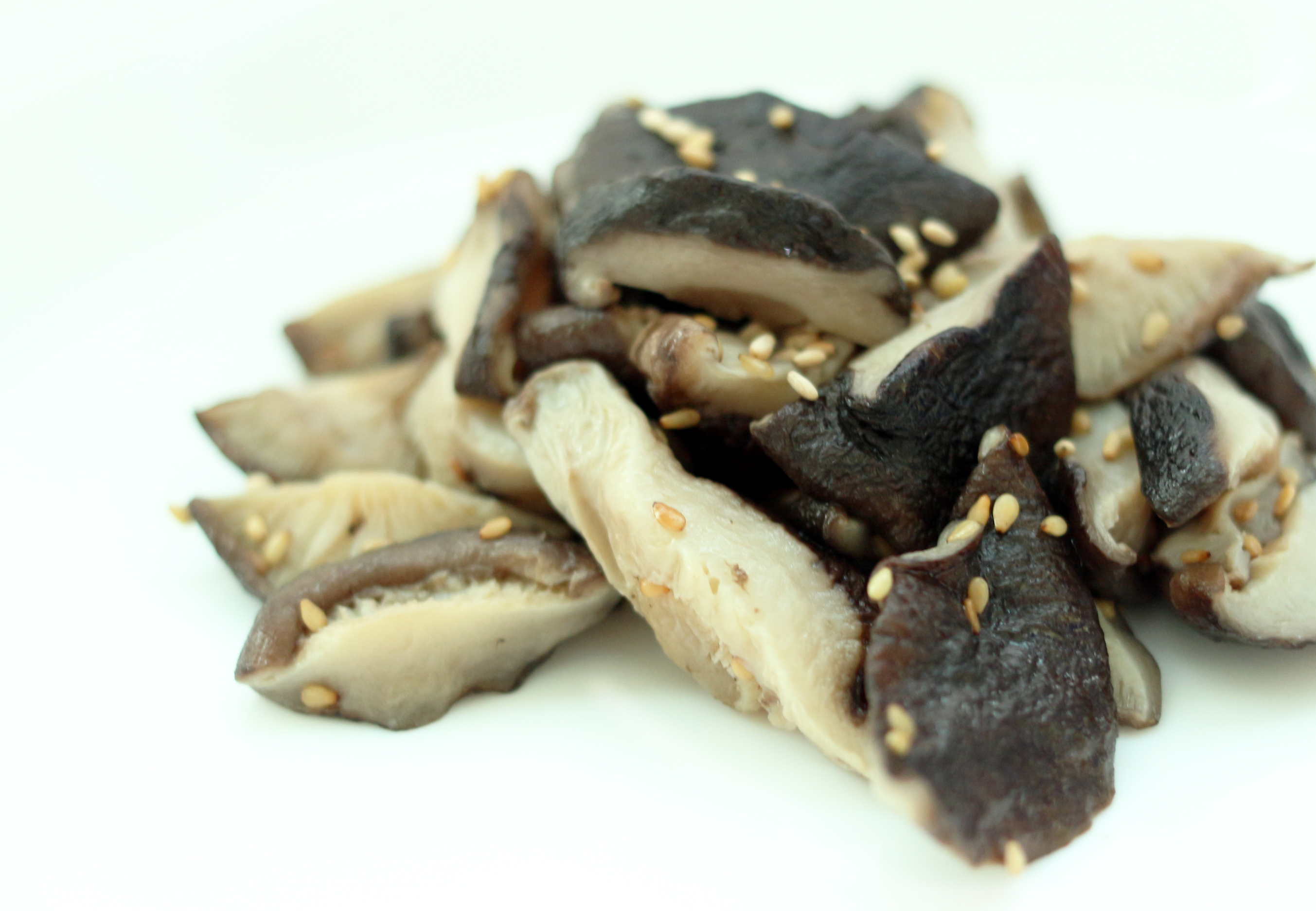
Korean pyogo-bokkeum (stir-fried shiitake mushroom)

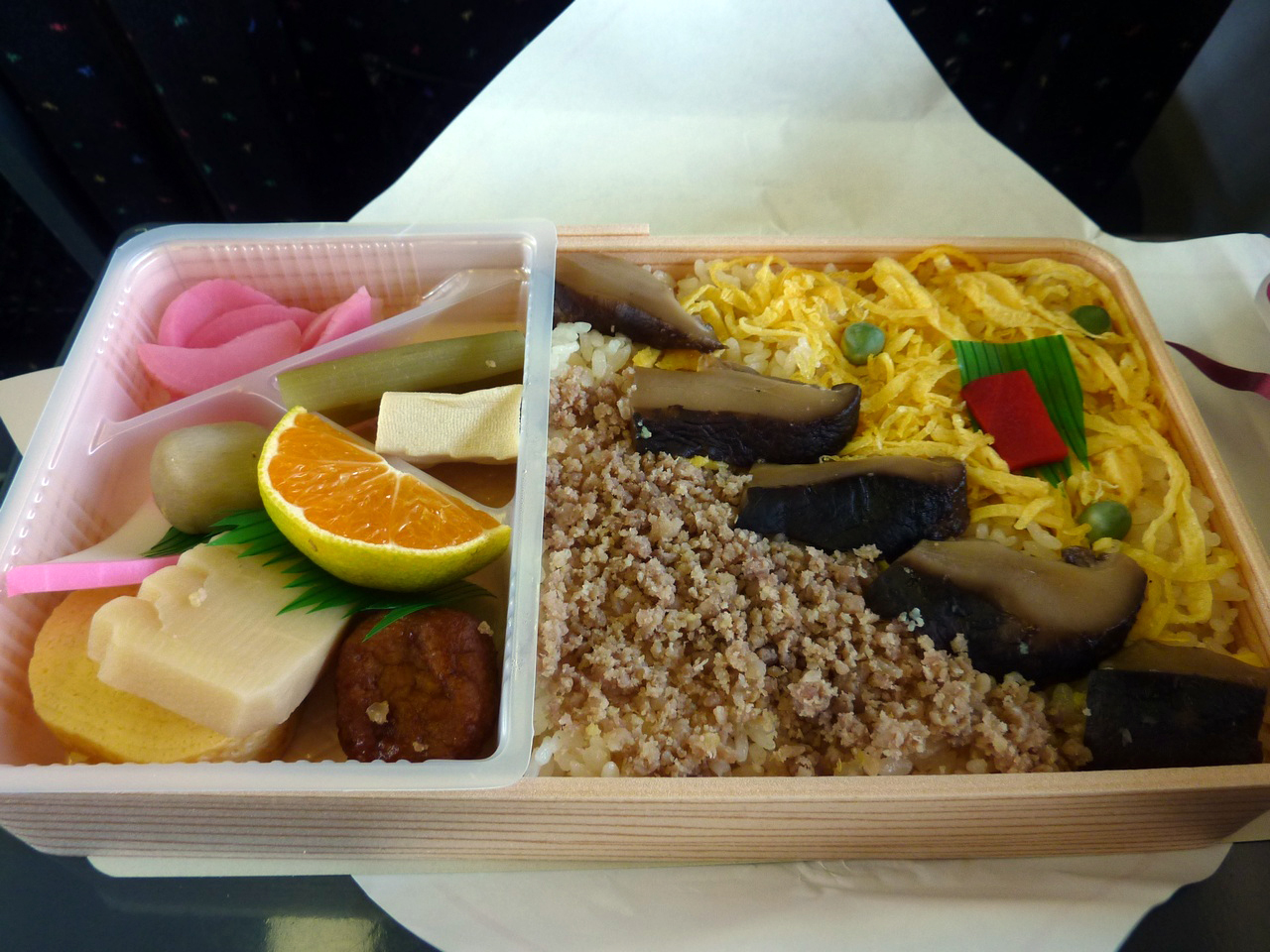
Japanese ekiben shiitake-meshi (椎茸めし)

Timelapse video of shiitake growth

Lentinan, a beta-glucan isolated from the shiitake mushroom

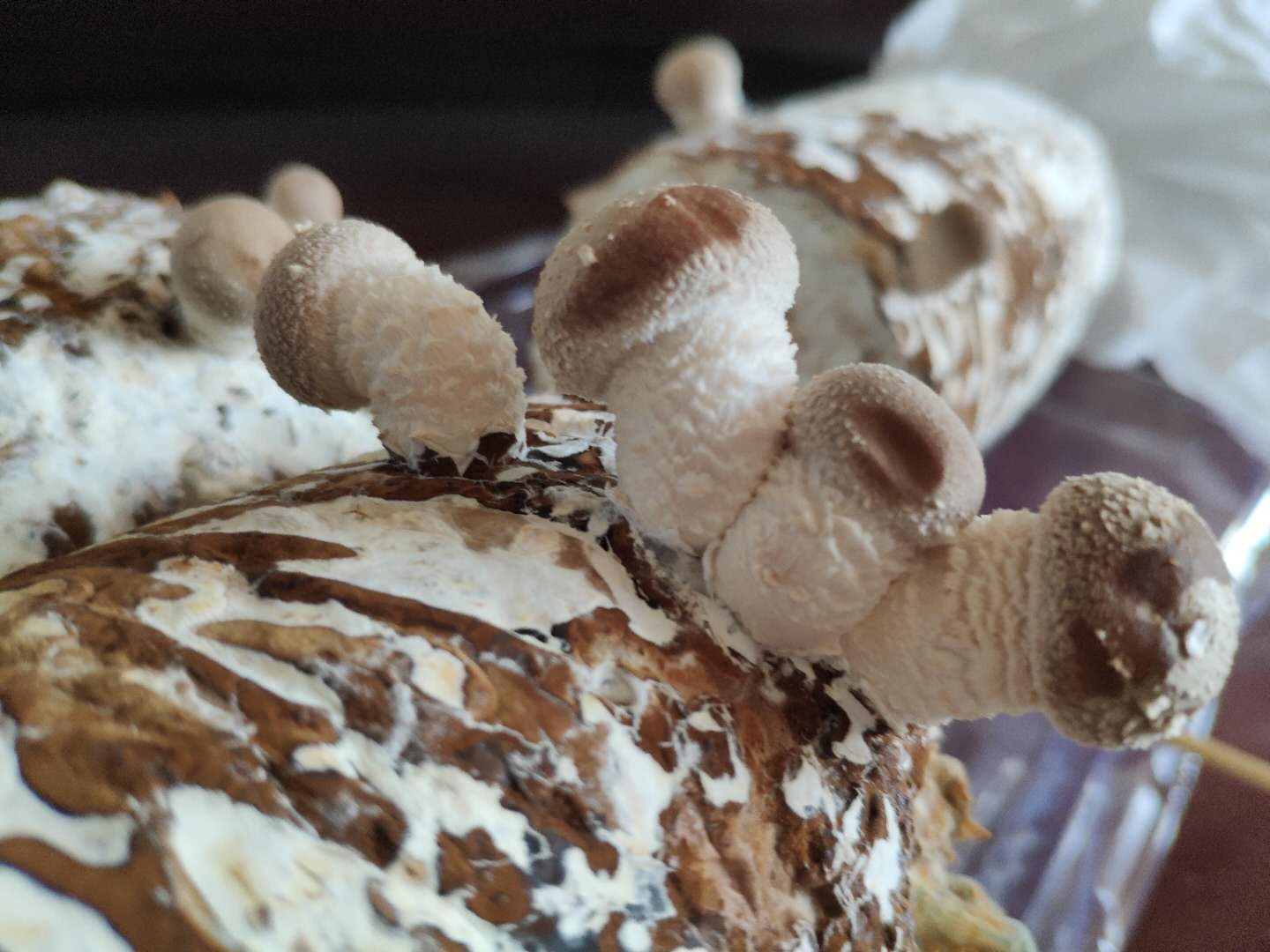
Young shiitake mushrooms on a log
