= David Pegler =

British mycologist (born 1938)

David Norman Pegler (born 2 November 1938) is a British mycologist who spent his entire professional career at Kew Gardens, where he became Head of Mycology and assistant keeper of the herbarium. A leading authority on tropical agarics, he described 11 new genera and over 180 species of fungi during expeditions to regions including East Africa, the Caribbean, and South America. He authored more than 200 scholarly articles and 35 books on fungal systematics whilst also producing popular field guides, and received the Distinguished Mycologist Award from the Mycological Society of America upon his retirement in 1998. His contributions to mycology have been honoured with several species named after him and with two fungal genera, Pegleromyces and Peglerochaete.

== Early life and education ==
Pegler developed an interest in natural history during his childhood, joining natural history societies and bird-watching groups. This led to his fascination with fungi, which eventually shaped his academic career. He entered Wye College, University of London in 1957 to study agriculture but later transferred to Chelsea College to pursue biology. In 1960, he completed his first degree and began his mycological career at Kew, where he studied under mycologist R.W.G. Dennis. Pegler remained at Kew throughout his professional life, advancing to become Head of Mycology and assistant keeper of the herbarium by the time of his retirement.

== Career and contributions ==
Pegler's academic research initially focused on the fungal flora of the Caribbean and later expanded to East Africa. He distinguished himself as an authority on tropical agarics, earning his PhD in 1974 with a thesis on "Agarics of East Africa". His doctoral work later formed the foundation for his comprehensive work, "A preliminary agaric flora of East Africa", published in 1977 through HMSO. In 1989, Pegler received a DSc from London University in recognition of his extensive research on Agaricales.

During an expedition to Uganda in 1968, Pegler and his colleague W.T. Stearn collected more than 1,000 specimens, adding approximately 300 species new to science. He later expanded his research to tropical regions worldwide, including the Lesser Antilles, Brazil, Australia, New Zealand, Paraguay, Argentina, Chile, and Hawaii. His work resulted in the description of 11 new genera and over 180 species of agarics.

== Publications and legacy ==
Pegler's prolific output included more than 200 scholarly articles and 35 books. Among his notable works were comprehensive treatments of British fungi families such as Boletaceae, Amanitaceae, Paxillaceae, Agaricaceae, and Pluteaceae. He made significant contributions to popular mycology as well, producing field guides including Mushrooms (1983, co-authored with D.A. Reid), The Mitchell Beazley Pocket Guide to Mushrooms and Toadstools (1980), and a series of "How to identify" guides focusing on edible and poisonous mushrooms.

Following his retirement in 1998, Pegler received the Distinguished Mycologist Award from the Mycological Society of America, and was elected an honorary member of the British Mycological Society. He maintained a deep interest in ethnomycology, studying the cultural significance of fungi, including hallucinogenic mushrooms in Middle America and the domestication of edible species in East Asia.

== Eponyms ==
A fungal genus Pegleromyces (family Tricholomataceae) published in 1981 by Rolf Singer, then genera Peglerochaete from India, (also in the family Tricholomataceae) by Sarwal & Locq. in 1983, and also several other fungal taxa have been named in his honour:

- Cuphophyllus pegleri Lodge 1999
- Deconica pegleriana (Guzmán) Ram.-Cruz & Guzmán 2012
- Endogone pegleri Y.J.Yao 1995
- Entoloma pegleri Courtec. 1984
- Favolaschia pegleri Parmasto 1999
- Inocybe pegleri Sarwal 1983
- Inonotus pegleri Ryvarden 1975
- Lactarius pegleri Pacioni & Lalli 1992
- Marasmius pegleri Courtec. 1984
- Melanospora pegleri D.Hawksw. & A.Henrici 1999
- Rhodocybe pegleri T.J.Baroni 1999 (now Clitocybe pegleri)

Pegler has published more than 250 research papers and several books, largely on fungal systematics. He was senior editor of the scientific journal Mycologist from 1987 to 1993.

== Selected publications ==
- Pegler DN. (1983). The genus Lentinus. A World Monograph. Kew Bulletin Additional Series. Vol. 10. London, UK: Her Majesty's Stationery Office. ISBN 0-11-242627-1.
- Pegler DN. Agaric Flora of Sri Lanka. Kew Bulletin Additional Series. Vol. 4. Kew, UK: Royal Botanic Gardens. ISBN 978-0112500049.
- Pegler DN, Roberts PJ, Spooner BM (1997). British Chanterelles and Tooth Fungi. Kew, UK: Royal Botanic Gardens. ISBN 978-1-900347-15-0.

== See also ==
- List of mycologists
