= Grisette =

The word grisette may mean:

- Grisette (person), a working-class woman, originally French, or later, good-time girl
- Grisette (beer), a variety of beer from the border region of Belgium and France.
- the Eurasian minnow

Any of several species of gill mushrooms in the genus Amanita:

- Grisette, Amanita vaginata
- Snakeskin grisette, Amanita ceciliae
- Tawny grisette, Amanita fulva
- Western grisette, Amanita pachycolea
- Constricted grisette, Amanita constricta
