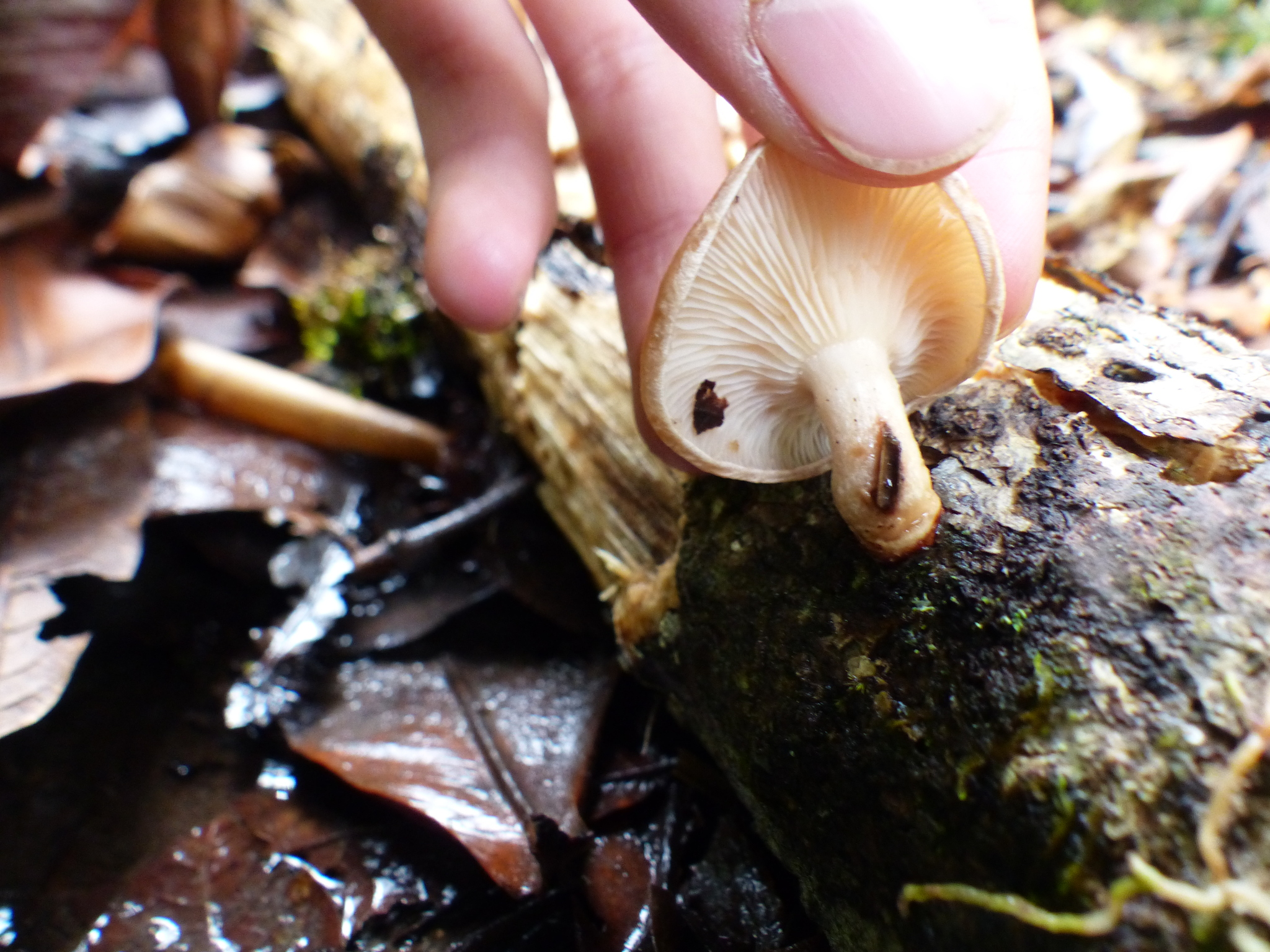

Scientific classification
- Kingdom: Fungi
- Division: Basidiomycota
- Class: Agaricomycetes
- Order: Agaricales
- Family: Omphalotaceae
- Genus: Lentinula
- Species: L. boryana

Binomial name
- Lentinula boryana (Berk. & Mont.) Pegler, 1976

Synonyms
- Lentinula cubensis (Berk. & M.A. Curtis) Earle ex Pegler, 1983; Lentinula boryanus (Berk. & Mont.) Singer, 1955; Lentinula alliaceus Murrill, 1943; Lentinula alliacea (Murrill) Murrill, 1943; Lentinula puiggarii Speg., 1919; Lentinula boryanus (Berk. & Mont.) Murrill, 1916; Lentinula detonsa (Fr.) Murrill, 1911; Lentinula umbilicata (Pat.) Sacc. & P. Syd., 1902; Lentinula umbilicata Pat., 1899; Lentinula proxima (Berk. & M. A. Curtis) Kuntze, 1891; Lentinula detonsa (Fr.) Kuntze, 1891; Lentinula cubensis (Berk. & M. A. Curtis) Kuntze, 1891; Lentinula proximus Berk. & M. A. Curtis, 1868; Lentinula cubensis Berk. & M. A. Curtis, 1868; Lentinula cubensis Berk. & M. A. Curtis, 1868; Lentinula leprieurii Mont., 1854; Lentinula detonsus Fr., 1851; Lentinula boryanus Berk. & Mont., 1849

= Lentinula boryana =

Species of fungus

Lentinula boryana is a species of edible agaric fungus in the family Omphalotaceae that is found in subtropical Americas. Originally described as Agaricus boryanus by Miles Joseph Berkeley & Camille Montagne in 1849, it was moved to the genus Lentinula and given its current name by David Pegler in 1976. It is the type species of the genus Lentinula.

This species has been recorded as a favored food of the pleasing fungus beetles Tritoma atriventris, T.erythrocephala and T.humeralis, which are often found together on the same fungus and may be conspecific.
