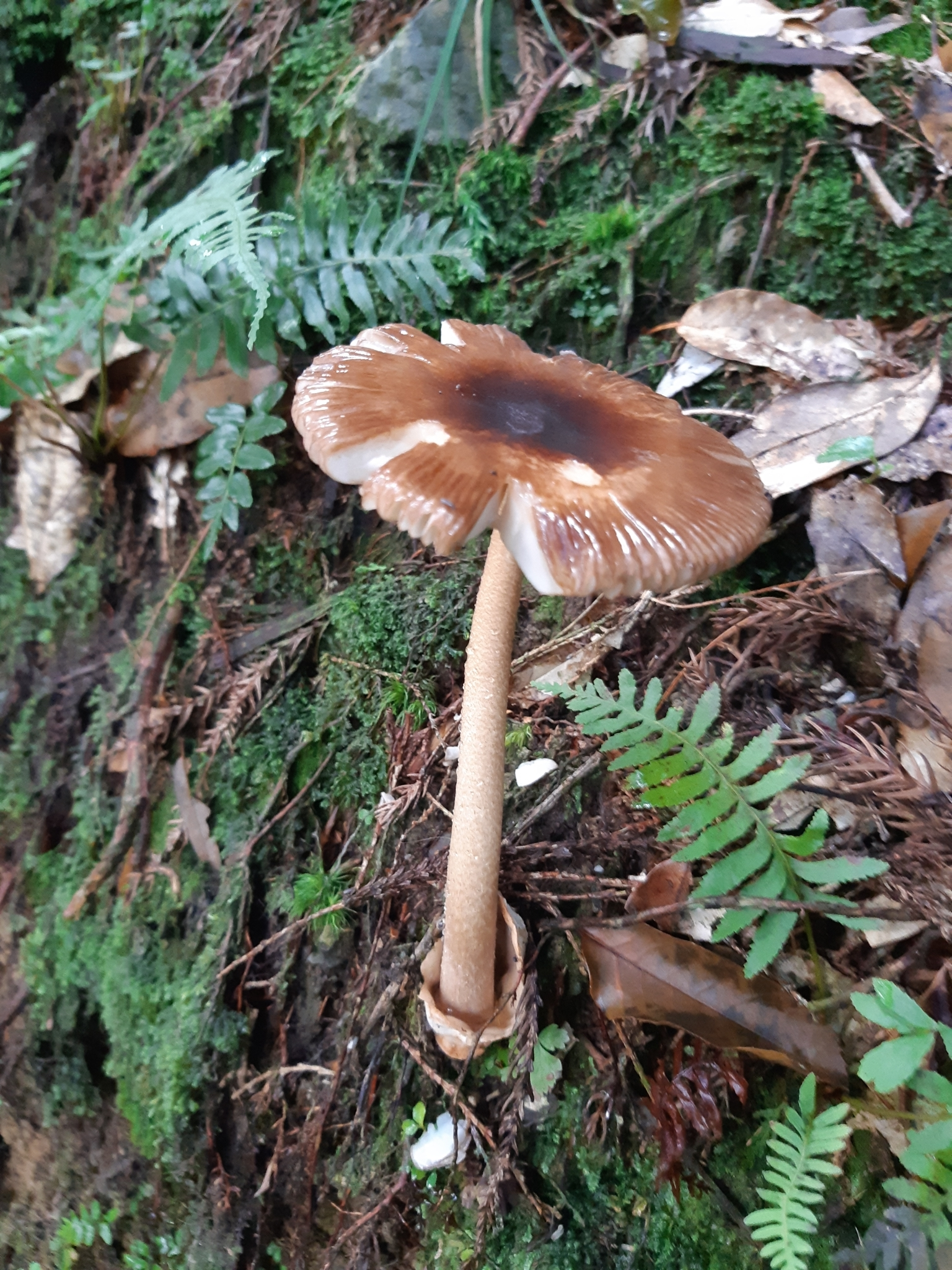

Scientific classification
- Domain: Eukaryota
- Kingdom: Fungi
- Division: Basidiomycota
- Class: Agaricomycetes
- Order: Agaricales
- Family: Amanitaceae
- Genus: Amanita
- Species: A. orientifulva

Binomial name
- Amanita orientifulva Zhu L.Yang, M.Weiß & Oberw. (2004)

= Amanita orientifulva =

Species of fungus

Amanita orientifulva Mycological characteristics
- Gills on hymenium
- Cap is umbonate
- Hymenium is free
- Stipe has a volva
- Spore print is white
- Ecology is mycorrhizal
- Edibility is unknown

Amanita orientifulva, also known as the Asian orange-brown ringless amanita, is a species of agaric fungus that fruits singly or scattered from June to September.

This medium to large agaric has a cap with a diameter measuring 5–14 centimetres (2–5 1/2 inches) and a stipe length of up to 15 cm (6 in) and a thickness of 0.5–3 cm (1/4–1 1/4 in). Gills on the cap underside are free from attachment to the stipe, crowded closely together, and white to cream in colour with brownish edges. The fruit body has a sac-like volva and lacks a ring on the stipe. The overall colour of the fruit body is brownish with a yellowish to orange cap centre. Its spores are spherical or nearly so, measuring 10–14 by 9.5–13 μm. Names for its similarity to the widespread A. fulva (a species with which it was previously confused), it can be distinguished by microscopic features of the volva.

It is found at altitudes ranging from 1,300–4,200 m (4,300–13,800 ft) in south-western China. It is associated with trees, especially Abies, Quercus, Salix, and occasionally Castanopsis.

== See also ==
- List of Amanita species
