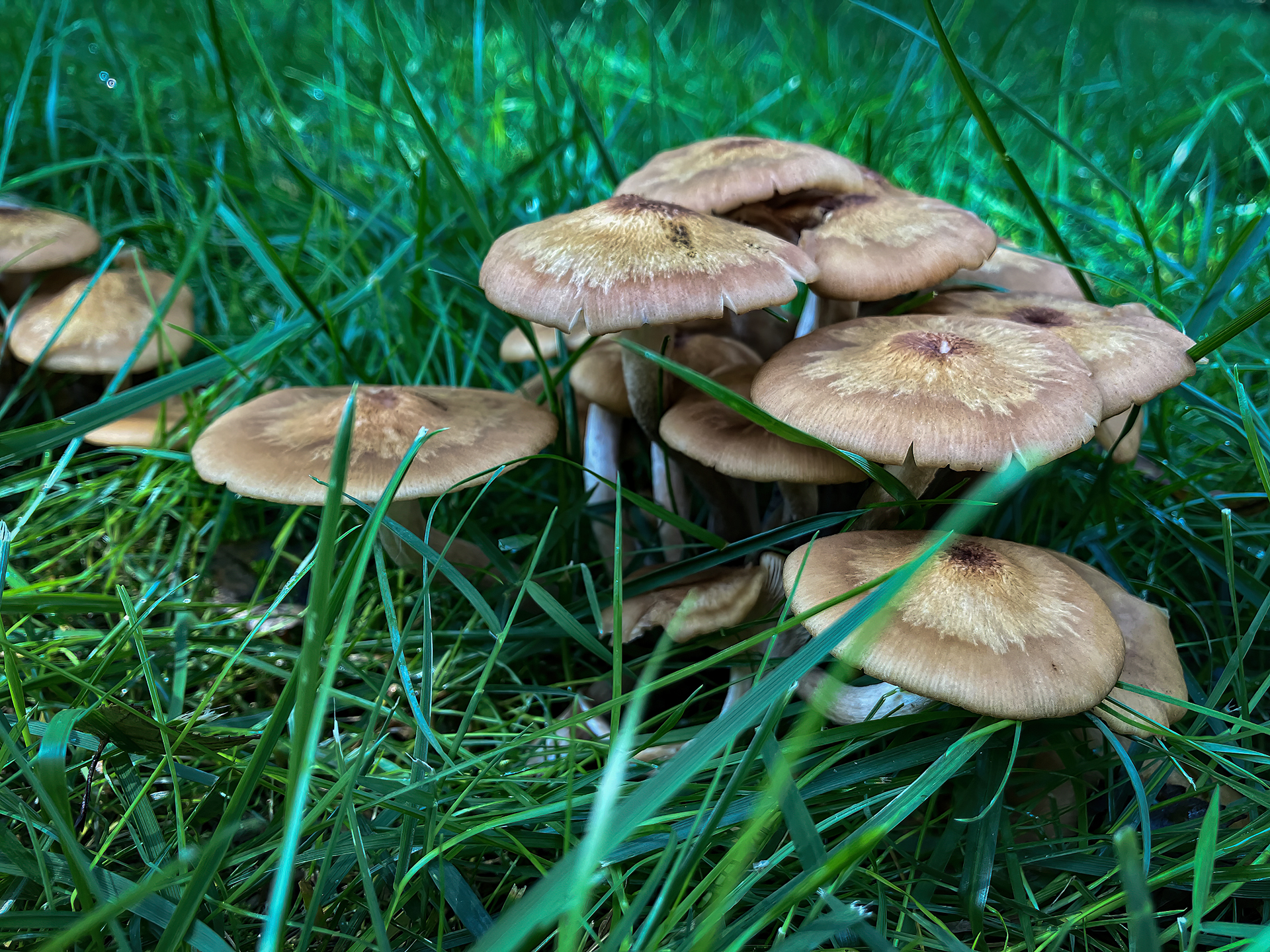

Scientific classification
- Kingdom: Fungi
- Division: Basidiomycota
- Class: Agaricomycetes
- Order: Agaricales
- Family: Physalacriaceae
- Genus: Desarmillaria
- Species: D. tabescens

Binomial name
- Desarmillaria tabescens (Scop.) Emel (1921)

Synonyms
- Agaricus gymnopodius Bull. (1798); Agaricus gymnopodius sensu Quelét (1948); Agaricus monadelphus Morgan (1883); Agaricus socialis DC. (1815); Agaricus tabescens Scop. (1772); Armillaria mellea var. tabescens (Scop.) Rea & Ramsb. (1917); Armillaria socialis (DC.) Herink (1973); Armillariella tabescens (Scop.) Singer; Clitocybe gymnopodia sensu Kühner & Romagnesi (1953); Clitocybe gymnopodia (Bull.) Gillet (1874); Clitocybe monadelpha (Morgan) Sacc. (1887); Clitocybe socialis (DC.) Gillet (1874); Clitocybe tabescens (Scop.) Bres. (1928); Collybia tabescens (Scop.) Fr. Flammula gymnopodia (Bull.) Quél. (1873); Lentinus caespitosus Berk. (1847); Monodelphus caespitosus (Berk.) Murrill, (1911); Omphalia gymnopodia sensu Quélet; Pholiota gymnopodia (Bull.) A.F.M.Reijnders (1998); Pleurotus caespitosus (Berk.) Sacc. (1887); Pocillaria caespitosa (Berk.) Kuntze (1891)

= Desarmillaria tabescens =

Species of fungus

Desarmillaria tabescens (also known as ringless honey mushroom) is a species of fungus in the family Physalacriaceae. It is a plant pathogen. The mycelium of the fungus is bioluminescent.

== Hosts and symptoms ==
Armillaria species infect a wide variety of woody plants. In a survey of 250 permanent plots of trees in Albania, Armillaria tabescens affected multiple species of trees including fir species, where it invaded when the plant was stressed. A study in Greece reported Armillaria tabescens to be more prevalent in areas where the trees were stressed due to limited moisture. In oak trees, it was slightly more damaging and could kill young trees. Armillaria tabescens was also recorded in poplar and eucalyptus plantations, and almond trees were found to be very susceptible to infection. The results of the study by Lushaj et al. showed that Armillaria tabescens was most frequently recorded on fruit and ornamental trees compared to the other species.

Armillaria tabescens causes separation of the bark from the wood by the production of mycelial fans in the trunk, a common sign of Armillaria root rot. It also causes gummosis, patches of gummy material on the surface of plants, which occurs in response to an external stimulus which causes the plant to ooze sap. Other common symptoms are soft rot of cortex, dwarfing, dieback, wilting, and abnormal coloring of the leaves. Small trees are killed rapidly by Armillaria tabescens and the symptoms aren't noticeable until the leaves wilt. However, on larger trees symptoms occur earlier and start as a thin crown with small leaves. A crown of a tree refers to any branches or foliage that are growing out from the trunk. Therefore, thinning of the crown would mean reduced branches and leaves. The trees eventually start yellowing and defoliating followed by fast wilting and dying of limbs. The fungus is a white rot so it breaks down lignin in the wood. The breaking down of the lignin leads to the trees becoming hollow.

== Distribution and ecology ==
Armillaria tabescens is found in warm and dry regions, so, in Europe, it tends to be in southern areas. It has also been found in altitudes ranging from sea level to 1,300 metres (4,300 ft). Studies in Europe have found that it exists in south-east England, France, Hungary, Italy, Portugal, Greece and, rarely, Germany and Switzerland. In Japan, it is very rare; only one isolate of Armillaria tabescens was found out of 59 sites surveyed.

Armillaria tabescens grows quickly at 28–30 °C (82–86 °F) and more slowly at 5 °C (41 °F). If the soil is moist, fruiting bodies are abundant. It is the first to fruit in September, compared to Armillaria mellea and Armillaria gallica. The fruiting bodies can be seen even earlier if the season has been exceptionally wet. Armillaria tabescens grows poorly on sand and produces shorter rhizomorphs. Rhizomorphs are threadlike structures in fungi that are made up of hyphae. Hyphae are branching structures that release enzymes to absorb nutrients from the host.

The pleasing fungus beetles Tritoma atriventris, Tritoma angulata, Tritoma biguttata, Tritoma erythrocephala and Tritoma humeralis have been recorded feeding on Armillaria tabescens.

== Pathogenesis ==
Armillaria tabescens is a heterothallic species of Armillaria. Heterothallic species perform anastomosis when haploid monokaryon come in contact with one another. Anastomosis is the connection or opening between two things, in this case the mycelium. Mycelium is the vegetative part of the fungus that consists of hyphae. If the two monokaryons are sexually compatible they form a clamp connection. This results in a mycelium consisting of dikaryotic cells. The dikaryon cells predominate in the vegetative phase. In the basidia, karyogamy occurs before meiosis and then the formation of basidiospores. The basidiospores then infect the host plant.

Armillaria tabescens is found to attack trees that are already stressed or have a wound. The pathogen can spread its mycelia and get into the trunk or root of a tree. The fungus has the ability to spread its mycelia throughout the root and trunk system and form mycelial mats. Mycelia is damaging to trees because they absorb the nutrients by secreting enzymes to breakdown the plant material. It specifically breaks down lignin because it is a white rot.

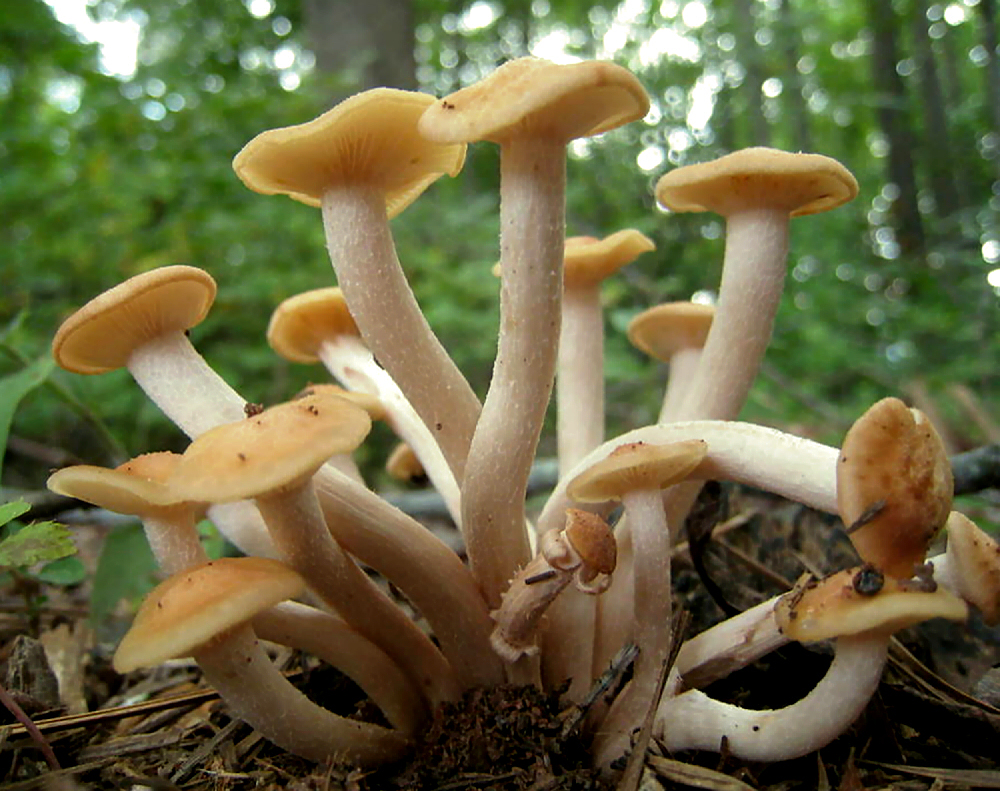

No rhizomorphs have been found for Armillaria tabescens in nature. However, Rishbeth and Kile did find rhizomorphs buried in the soil on inocula. Since the species does not produce rhizomorphs commonly in the nature, infected roots must come into contact with other potential hosts for infection to occur. So, root grafting provides an effective pathway for the spread of this pathogen. Tsopelas conducted an experiment of inoculating almond trees with Armillaria tabescens and two other Armillaria species. The result of the experiment was that basidiocarps developed 6–8 weeks after the inoculation. The basidiocarps are recognized by not having an annulus around the stalk of the basidium. The basidiospores infect the trees. After two years, it only killed 3 out of the 16 trees and two other trees had symptoms of dieback.

== Edibility ==
The species can be cooked and eaten, even being regarded as choice, but has been reported to cause upset stomachs. Armillaria tabescens additionally contains small levels of antioxidants which have been studied for possible use as protection against lipid peroxidation and free radical damage.

== See also ==
- List of bioluminescent fungi
