= Tritoma atriventris =

Scientific classification
- Kingdom: Animalia
- Phylum: Arthropoda
- Clade: Pancrustacea
- Class: Insecta
- Order: Coleoptera
- Suborder: Polyphaga
- Infraorder: Cucujiformia
- Family: Erotylidae
- Genus: Tritoma
- Species: T. atriventris

Binomial name
- Tritoma atriventris LeConte, 1847

Synonyms
- Tritoma evanescens Casey, 1924

Species of beetle

Tritoma atriventris is a species of small pleasing fungus beetle (family Erotylidae) endemic to the USA. It belongs to subfamily Tritominae, or – in taxonomic arrangements that prefer a more comprehensive subfamily Erotylinae – in tribe Tritomini of the Erotylinae.

This species is probably very closely related to T.erythrocephala, T.humeralis, and the disputed T.aulica; they differ little except in color pattern, and might form a species complex or even be subspecies or mere morphs of one single species.

== Description ==
T.atriventris is a tiny beetle, about 2.7-4.35 mm long and 1.7-2.6 mm wide as adults, widely oval in shape with somewhat pointed wingtips. Elytra and most of the body are black; the head, pronotum, legs, and the "stalk" of the antennae are rusty orange-red; the "club" of the antenna, tip of the abdomen, mid-and hindleg coxae and scutellum are reddish brown with a more or less pronounced black hue.

These beetles are very similar to many of their slimmer and flatter relatives in genus Triplax in coloration, and even more similar to T.biguttata affinis. The latter, however, has an orange underside, and conspicuously plump tips to the hindleg tibiae. As typical for Tritoma sensu stricto, T.atriventris has a triangular mentum, as well as an epistome whose tip is sharply cut off, causing the line running parallel to the epistome margin to angle towards the antennae insertions.

Head
The head has small compound eyes have tiny ommatidia, indicating a diurnal or crepuscular lifestyle, but with overall rather little reliance on eyesight. Its surface covered in moderately densely strewn moderately-sized punctures; some individuals have notably denser punctuation. Adults possess file-like structures at the sides of the neck attachment, which, when the beetle wiggles its head, rub against the chitin and produce a squeaking sound; the degree of development of these structures is unreliable for distinguishing males and females. The epistome has a narrow but unbroken angled margin around the straight tip; a transverse stripe separates the margin from the bulk of the epistome. The "cheek" lobes below the compound eyes are vestigial, do not reach to the lower edge of the eyes, and are hidden by the ends of the maxillary palps. The antenna length is less than half of the pronotal base width, with antenna segment 3 almost as long as the segments 4 and 5 together, and a "clubbed" antenna tip which is about half again as long as it is wide and ends with a small segment 11.

The galea and lacinia of the maxilla resemble those of the related genera Ischyrus and Pseudischyrus; those of Triplax are also similar except for having two small curved teeth at the tip of the lacinia. The maxillary palps have an end segment that is rounded, somewhat triangular, and a bit more than half as long as it is wide; it lacks a conspicuous brush at the tip. The labium has a mentum that is mid-sized and fairly narrowly triangular. The labial palps end in a narrow segment with a strong bristle at the outer side and a tiny brush at the tip, and the mouth-cavity sides are flattened lobes.

Body, wings and legs
The prothorax is almost as wide at the base as the wings at their widest point, and has the same pattern of punctures as the head in center, with somewhat smaller, denser, and less distinct punctures to the sides. The pronotum is fairly wide and trapezoid-shaped, with the rear edge more than half again as long as the forward edge. A thin margin runs around the sides and front of the pronotum, but is absent from the rear. In each corner of the pronotum, there is a small and inconspicuous pore, and some individuals (those with denser punctuation on the head) have near the rear edge a pair of weak impressions, in which the punctuations are larger. The prosternum is bell-shaped, with lengthwise lines at the center margin of the leg attachments extending to the forward edge of the prosternum and sharply curving towards each other in front of the leg attachments.

On the metasternum, the lines between the leg attachments are clearly engraved, and extend to about halfway between the rear edge of the leg attachment and the side of the metasternum. The scutellum is bluntly heart-shaped. The elytra are ornamented with regular lines of small punctuations; they also lack a distinct margin at the base, except for a very slim margin in front of the "shoulders".

The attachments of each leg pair are widely separated. The tibiae are only slightly widened towards the ends; their upper/outer edge is narrowed to a very thin "razor edge" towards the tip. The first three segments of the tarsi are increasingly widened; segment 4 of the tarsi is reduced, attached to the upper centerside of segment 3, and rigidly joined to segment 5.

On the abdomen, coxal lines are present, and the intercoxal process is wide and has a cut-off or slightly rounded tip. Males and females do not have conspicuously different external abdominal structures. The aedeagus of the male genitalia resembles Pseudischyrus. The tegminal arms are firmly joined at the forward end, form a tooth-like lobe on the upper sides just in front of the basal piece, and have a narrow and almost membranous section below. The median strut does not exceed the median lobe in length. The internal sac is short and entirely hidden within the sclerotized median lobe; its anterior end lacks conspicuous point-like muscle attachments. The ejaculatory duct does not continue into the internal sac. The female genitalia are conspicuously shortened, but all parts are present and functional. Only the proctigeral and vulvar lobes are close to the typical size in Erotylidae; at the eighth abdominal segment, the genital tube has short and weakly sclerotized lines. The seminal receptacle is small, rounded, and bears a short well-sclerotized arm.

== Distribution and ecology ==
T.atriventris is found in the southern USA, from Virginia to Florida in the east to Oklahoma, Kansas and Texas in the west. Described from a South Carolina specimen, LeConte collection 6770 at the MCZ, in the northeast of its range it has been recorded up to the historical Norfolk County, Virginia, but the exact locality ("Duke") is not clear. In Kansas, it ranges at least to Riley County, and in Oklahoma it has been recorded as far west as Cedar Springs in Major County, about 6 miles (10 km) southwest of Fairview; in Texas it occurs southwestward at least to the upper Guadalupe River (at Kerrville) and the lower San Antonio River (at Goliad), i.e. 100-150 miles (180-240 km) northeast of the Rio Grande. Isolated records from elsewhere, e.g. northwestern Costa Rica or Chicago, Illinois, are probably due to erroneous identifications of species or locality.

The adults are active almost throughout the year in much of their range. In Lucedale on the Gulf of Mexico coast of Mississippi, and in Eastland County in central Texas, adults are around as early as mid-late March, and they have been collected in Goliad (southern Texas) in mid-November, and in Hope, southwestern Arkansas, even on December 10. More often, however, they are seen from May to September, and like most of their relatives they are more plentiful in the hottest summer months. Often, individuals of T.erythrocephala are found on the same fungus as T.atriventris, and in Kansas, the more northernly T.humeralis is also found as part of such groups. The enigmatic T.aulica occurs in this area; its coloration is intermediate between T.atriventris and T.humeralis. Given that their genitalia – a main factor upholding reproductive isolation in beetles – are essentially alike, allowing each to mate with the other two (or three), this suggests that they are not distinct species. However, T.humeralis seems to have less strict food preferences than the others.

=== Food ===
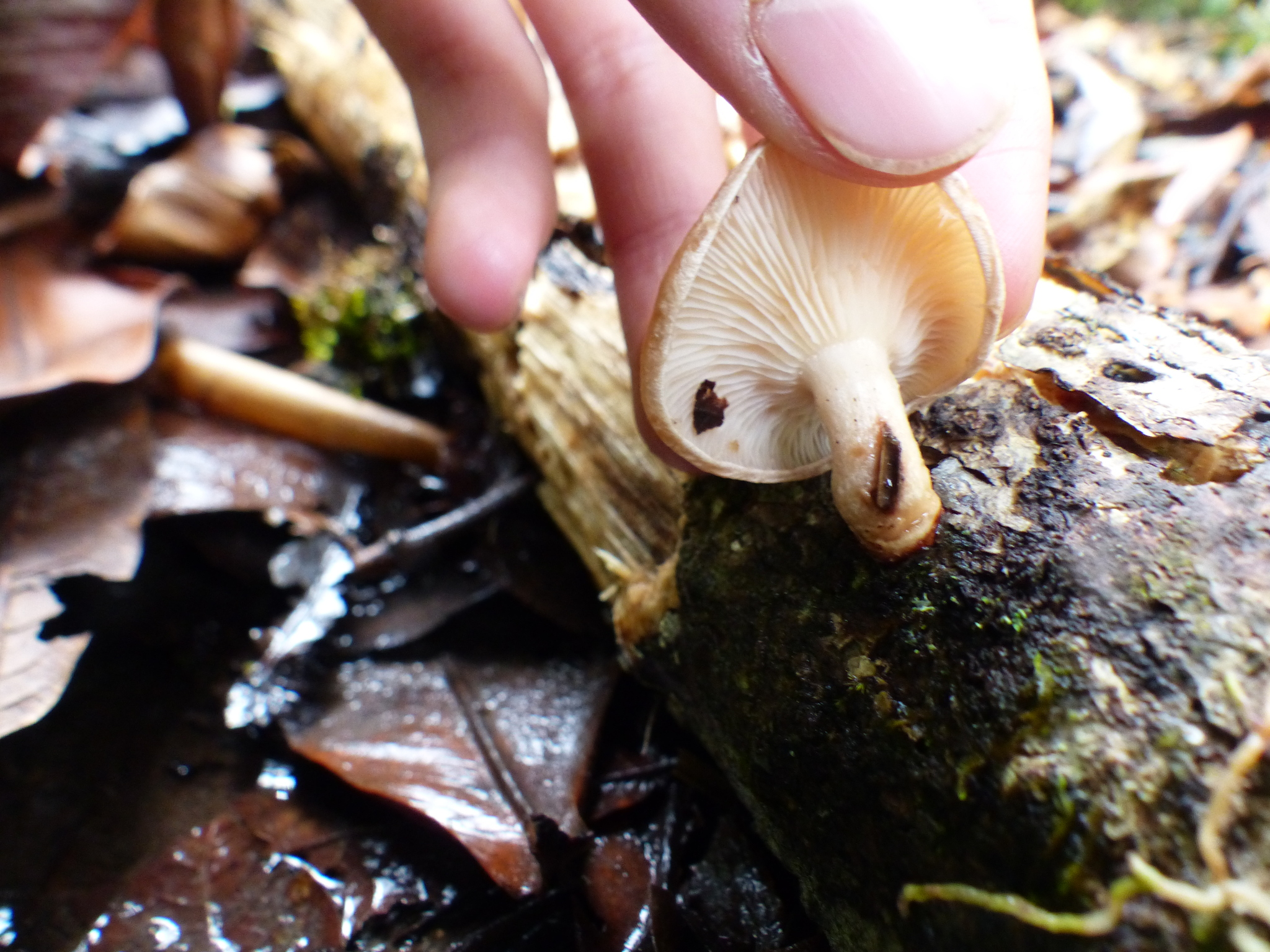
Lentinula boryana ranges into the subtropical south of the USA, where it is eaten by T.atriventris/erythrocephala

This beetle, as usual for Tritoma sensu stricto, eats gilled fungi of order Agaricales as larva and adults, with similar food preferences as T.erythrocephala and T.humeralis. Specifically, the ringless honey mushroom (Desarmillaria tabescens, formerly in Armillaria) of family Physalacriaceae, as well as the eastern jack-o'lantern mushroom Omphalotus illudens and Lentinula boryana, both of family Omphalotaceae, have been named as suitable food for both T.erythrocephala and T.atriventris larvae. Larval food species shared with T.humeralis are, for example, members of genus Pluteus (family Pluteaceae) – possibly the deer mushroom P.cervinus –, and the spring polypore Lentinus arcularius of family Polyporaceae in the order Polyporales.

Adults have also been found in considerable numbers on the club-footed clitocybe (Ampulloclitocybe clavipes) of family Hygrophoraceae. A few records of adult T.atriventris also exist for an unspecified Amanita (family Amanitaceae), the honey fungus Armillaria mellea (or possibly a related species formerly included there), and the rooting shank Hymenopellis radicata of the Physalacriaceae. More unusually, there also exist a few records of adult T.humeralis from Polyporales, namely the giant polypore Meripilus giganteus of family Meripilaceae and the hexagonal-pored polypore Neofavolus alveolaris (or N.americanus if this is considered a separate species) of family Polyporaceae. None of those occasional records, however, necessarily imply that the beetles were actually feeding on those fungus species rather than simply sheltering there, or that the fungus in question was correctly identified.

One adult was collected from a supposed "Carduus" (an introduced species, or a similar thistle from another genus) at Denton, Texas, on a May 23. This is one of the few records of a pleasing fungus beetle associating with a flower.
