= Tritoma erythrocephala =

Scientific classification
- Kingdom: Animalia
- Phylum: Arthropoda
- Clade: Pancrustacea
- Class: Insecta
- Order: Coleoptera
- Suborder: Polyphaga
- Infraorder: Cucujiformia
- Family: Erotylidae
- Genus: Tritoma
- Species: T. erythrocephala

Binomial name
- Tritoma erythrocephala Lacordaire, 1842

Synonyms
- Cyrtotriplax erythrocephala (Lacordaire, 1842); Tritoma flavipes Lacordaire, 1842 (non Panzer, 1792: preoccupied)

Species of beetle

Tritoma erythrocephala, the red-headed tritoma, is a species of small pleasing fungus beetle (family Erotylidae) endemic to the USA. It belongs to subfamily Tritominae, or – in taxonomic arrangements that prefer a more comprehensive subfamily Erotylinae – in tribe Tritomini of the Erotylinae.

This species is probably very closely related to T. atriventris, T. humeralis, and the disputed T. aulica; they differ little except in color pattern, and might form a species complex or even be subspecies or mere morphs of one single species.

== Description ==
T. erythrocephala is a tiny beetle, about 3-4.1 mm long and 1.9-2.7 mm wide as adults, widely oval in shape with somewhat pointed wingtips. They are very similar to T. humeralis, but lack the red spots on the elytra. Typical adults are mostly black, with the "clubs" of the antennae and the tip of the abdomen light reddish-brown, and the head, legs and antenna "stalks" orange. As usual for Tritoma sensu stricto, T. erythrocephala has a triangular mentum, as well as an epistome whose tip is sharply cut off, causing the line running parallel to the epistome margin to angle towards the antennae insertions.

After emerging from the pupae, before their exoskeleton fully hardens and darkens, these beetles resemble T. angulata, which can be distinguished by its conspicuously widened tips of the tibiae. But even noted Erotylidae expert George Crotch got fooled by the close similarity – the T. erythrocephala in his collection actually was a T.angulata (and one of his two supposed T.angulata was actually a Pseudischyrus nigrans). In other individuals of T.erythrocephala, the scutellum and the tip of the prosternum maintain a distinct red hue even when fully mature. Beetles distinguished as "T. flavipes" by Jean Lacordaire – in the same work in which he described T. erythrocephala – refers to a morph of the present species. The main distinguishing trait is the punctuation of the carapace, which in "flavipes" is far more densely-packed, with the individual punctures less sharply marked and of a more typical size. Also, the tibia tips are usually prominently expanded in these individuals. They often have a reddish underside, and in the most extreme examples (such as described by Lacordaire) the head is dark brown, making them look a lot like T. angulata.

Head
The head has small compound eyes have tiny ommatidia, indicating a diurnal or crepuscular lifestyle, but with overall rather little reliance on eyesight. Its surface is almost smooth, with a few scattered tiny pinprick-like punctures. Adults possess file-like structures at the sides of the neck attachment, which, when the beetle wiggles its head, rub against the chitin and produce a squeaking sound; the degree of development of these structures is unreliable for distinguishing males and females. The epistome has a narrow but unbroken angled margin around the straight tip; a transverse stripe separates the margin from the bulk of the epistome. The "cheek" lobes below the compound eyes are vestigial, do not reach to the lower edge of the eyes, and are hidden by the ends of the maxillary palps. The antenna length is less than half of the pronotal base width, with antenna segment 3 almost as long as the segments 4 and 5 together, and a "clubbed" antenna tip which is about half again as long as it is wide and ends with a small segment 11.

The galea and lacinia of the maxilla resemble those of the related genera Ischyrus and Pseudischyrus; those of Triplax are also similar except for having two small curved teeth at the tip of the lacinia. The maxillary palps have an end segment that is rounded, somewhat triangular, and a bit more than half as long as it is wide; it lacks a conspicuous brush at the tip. The labium has a mentum that is mid-sized and fairly narrowly triangular. The labial palps end in a narrow segment with a strong bristle at the outer side and a tiny brush at the tip, and the mouth-cavity sides are flattened lobes.

Body, wings and legs
The prothorax is almost as wide at the base as the wings at their widest point, and has the same characteristic pattern of few tiny and sharply-impressed punctures as the head. The pronotum is fairly wide and trapezoid-shaped, with the rear edge more than half again as long as the forward edge. A thin margin runs around the sides and front of the pronotum, but is absent from the rear. In each corner of the pronotum, there is a small and inconspicuous pore, and near the rear edge there is a pair of weak impressions, in which the punctuations are larger. The prosternum is bell-shaped, with lengthwise lines at the center margin of the leg attachments extending to the forward edge of the prosternum and sharply curving towards each other in front of the leg attachments.

On the metasternum, the lines between the leg attachments are clearly engraved, and extend to about halfway between the rear edge of the leg attachment and the side of the metasternum. The scutellum is bluntly heart-shaped. The elytra are ornamented with regular lines of small punctuations; they also lack a distinct margin at the base, except for a very slim margin in front of the "shoulders".

The attachments of each leg pair are widely separated. The tibiae are only slightly widened towards the ends; their upper/outer edge is narrowed to a very thin "razor edge" towards the tip. The first three segments of the tarsi are increasingly widened; segment 4 of the tarsi is reduced, attached to the upper centerside of segment 3, and rigidly joined to segment 5.

On the abdomen, coxal lines are present, and the intercoxal process is wide and has a cut-off or slightly rounded tip. Males and females do not have conspicuously different external abdominal structures. The aedeagus of the male genitalia resembles Pseudischyrus. The tegminal arms are firmly joined at the forward end, form a tooth-like lobe on the upper sides just in front of the basal piece, and have a narrow and almost membranous section below. The median strut does not exceed the median lobe in length. The internal sac is short and entirely hidden within the sclerotized median lobe; its anterior end lacks conspicuous point-like muscle attachments. The ejaculatory duct does not continue into the internal sac. The female genitalia are conspicuously shortened, but all parts are present and functional. Only the proctigeral and vulvar lobes are close to the typical size in Erotylidae; at the eighth abdominal segment, the genital tube has short and weakly sclerotized lines. The seminal receptacle is small, rounded, and bears a short well-sclerotized arm.

== Distribution and ecology ==
In its original description located no more precisely than "North America", this beetle is only found in the northeastern to southern USA. It occurs from upstate New York south of the Great Lakes region to Illinois and Missouri in the north, and in the south from Florida to Texas (where it ranges at least to Houston). Its northern limit is not well known; in the west its range extends to Kansas, where it has been collected near Topeka. In the O.Lugger collection at the University of Minnesota, there are two specimens labeled '"C. Col.", which other beetle specimens in this collection suggest to mean "Central Colorado". No other records of this or another Tritoma are known from anywhere nearby, suggesting a labeling error occurred in preparing these specimens.

The adults are active in the warmer months; records extend at least from early April to late October. Unlike most of their relatives, which are conspicuously more commonly seem in the hottest 6 weeks of the year, collection dates of T. erythrocephala specimens seem more evently distributed over the warm season. Often, individuals of T. atriventris and/or T. humeralis are found on the same fungus as T. erythrocephala, with the former occurring in the south, the latter in the north of the range of T. erythrocephala. In Kansas, all three taxa, as well as the enigmatic T. aulica, can be encountered together, and given that their genitalia – a main factor upholding reproductive isolation in beetles – are essentially alike, allowing each to mate with the other two, this suggests that they are not distinct species. However, T. humeralis seems to have less strict food preferences than the other two (or three, if T. aulica is considered distinct).

=== Food ===
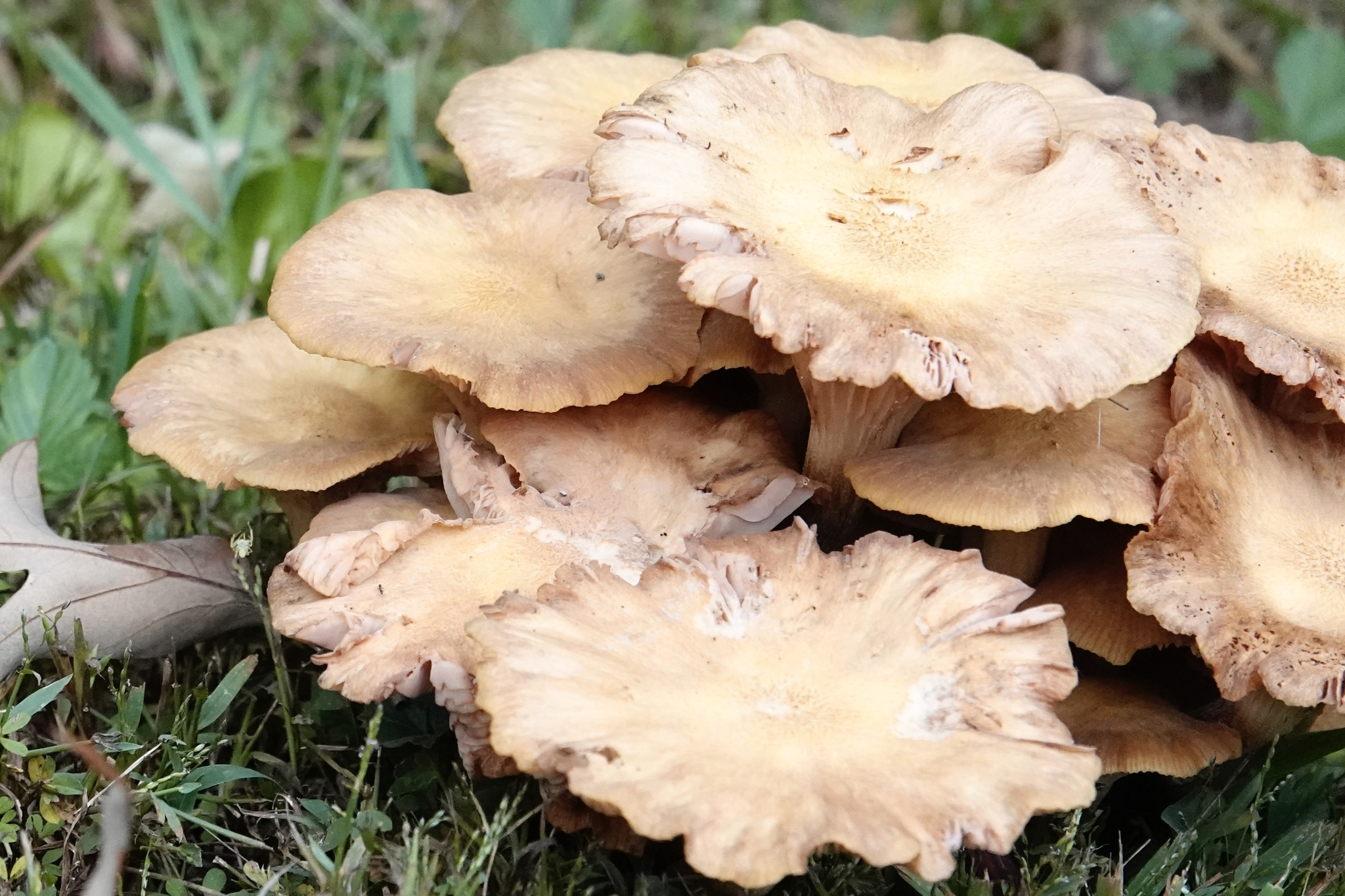
A favorite food of T. erythrocephala: ringless honey mushrooms (Hanover County, Virginia)

This beetle, as usual for Tritoma sensu stricto, eats gilled fungi of order Agaricales as larva and adults, with similar or identical food preferences as T. atriventris. Specifically, the ringless honey mushroom (Desarmillaria tabescens, formerly in Armillaria) of family Physalacriaceae, as well as the eastern jack-o'lantern mushroom Omphalotus illudens and Lentinula boryana, both of family Omphalotaceae, have been named as suitable food for both T. erythrocephala and T. atriventris larvae.

Additionally, adult T. erythrocephala have been occasionally found on Amanita vaginata of family Amanitaceae, and an undetermined species of "Marasmius", which may refer to any number of species in families Marasmiaceae or – perhaps more likely – Omphalotaceae or Physalacriaceae. None of those rare reports, however, necessarily imply that the beetles were actually feeding on those fungus species rather than simply sheltering there, or that the fungus in question was correctly identified.
