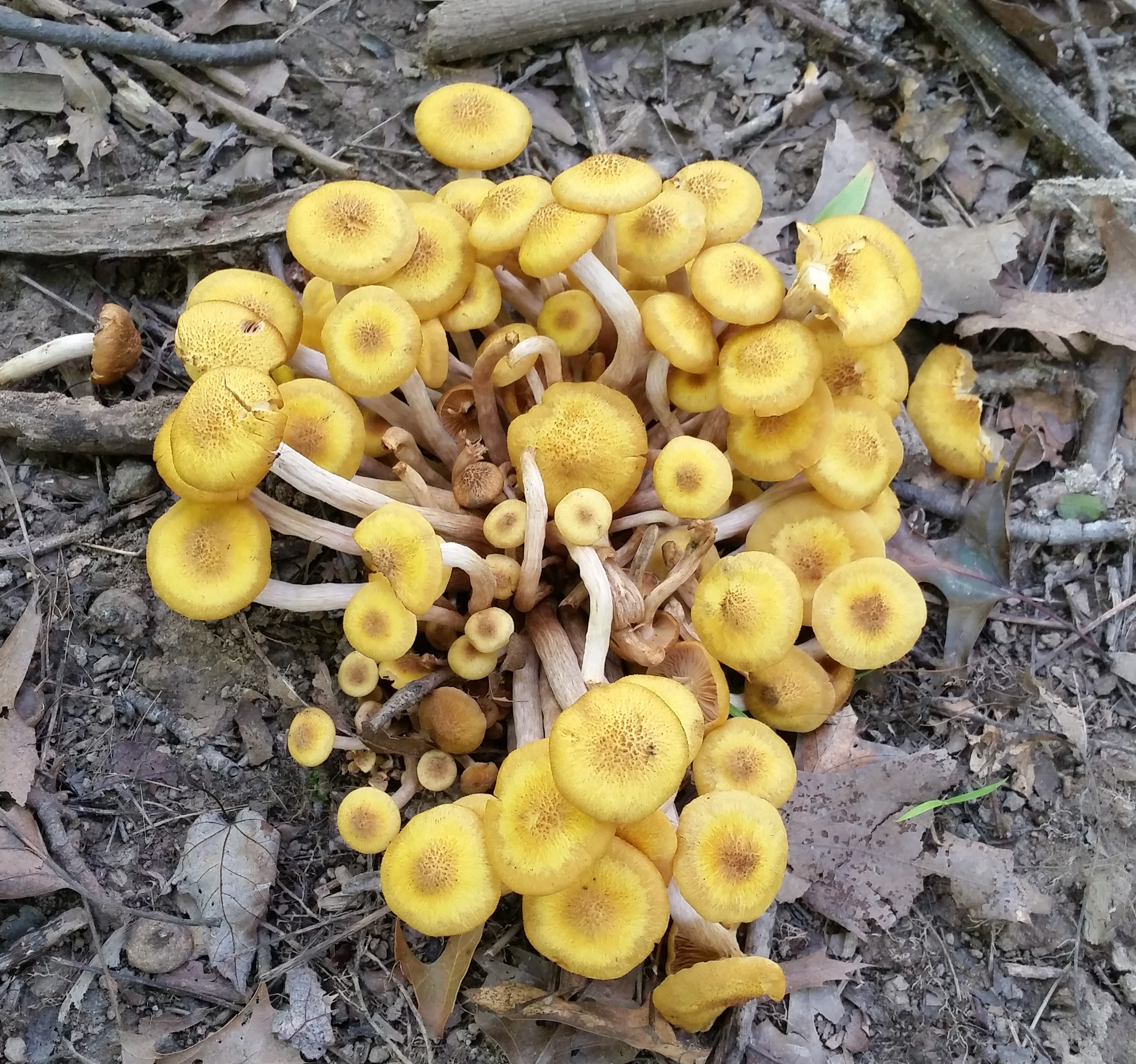
- Desarmillaria tabescens

Scientific classification
- Domain: Eukaryota
- Kingdom: Fungi
- Division: Basidiomycota
- Class: Agaricomycetes
- Order: Agaricales
- Family: Physalacriaceae
- Genus: Desarmillaria (Herink) R.A.Koch & M.C.Aime, 2017

= Desarmillaria =

Genus of fungi

Desarmillaria is a genus of fungi belonging to the family Physalacriaceae.

The genus has almost cosmopolitan distribution.

Species:

- Desarmillaria ectypa (Fr.) R.A.Koch & Aime
- Desarmillaria tabescens (Scop.) R.A.Koch & Aime
- Desarmillaria caespitosa
