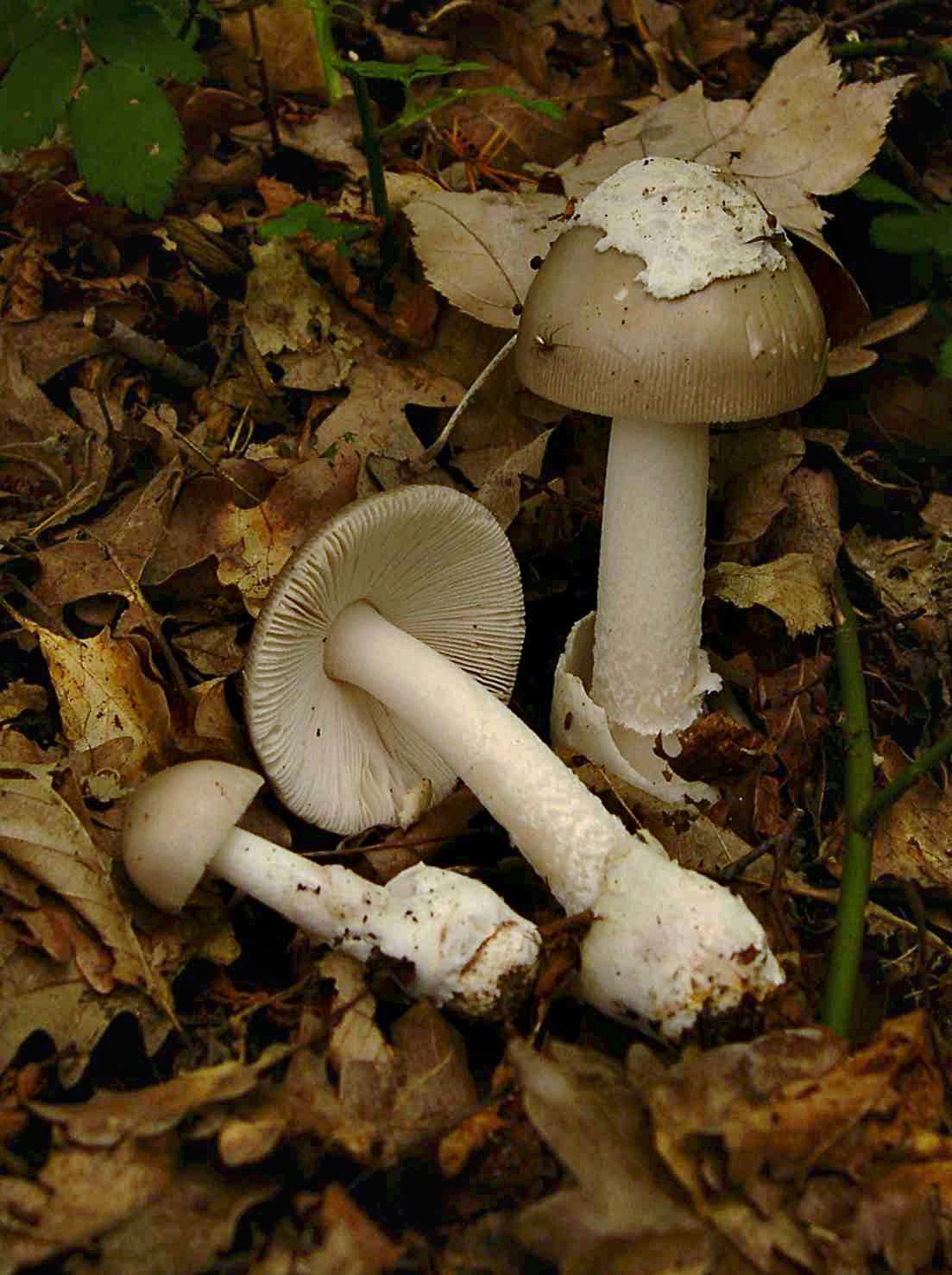

Conservation status
- Secure (NatureServe)

Scientific classification
- Kingdom: Fungi
- Division: Basidiomycota
- Class: Agaricomycetes
- Order: Agaricales
- Family: Amanitaceae
- Genus: Amanita
- Species: A. vaginata

Binomial name
- Amanita vaginata (Bull.) Lam. (1783)

Synonyms
- Amanitopsis vaginata Vaginata plumbea

= Amanita vaginata =

Species of fungus

Amanita vaginata
- Mycological characteristics
- Gills on hymenium
- Cap is umbonate or ovate
- Hymenium is free
- Stipe has a volva
- Spore print is white
- Ecology is mycorrhizal
- Edibility is edible but not recommended

Amanita vaginata, commonly known as the grisette or the grisette amanita, is an edible mushroom in the fungus family Amanitaceae, but must be thoroughly cooked to destroy its toxins. The cap is gray or brownish, 5 to 10 centimetres (2 to 4 inches) in diameter, and has furrows around the edge that duplicate the gill pattern underneath. Unlike many other Amanita mushrooms, A. vaginata lacks a ring on the stem.

A. vaginata is widely distributed in Europe and North America. It is not recommended for consumption due to the possibility of confusing it with related poisonous species.

== Description ==
The cap is 3 to 10 centimetres (1 to 4 inches) in diameter and gray to grayish-brown in color; initially the cap is oval, then as it matures it becomes progressively conical, convex, and eventually flattened, sometimes with a small umbo (a rounded elevation in the center of the cap). The gills are white, free (not attached to the stem) to narrowly attached, moderately crowded together, and sometimes have a grayish tint; the lamellulae (small gills that run from the edge of the cap towards the stem) are truncate. The flesh is white and thin, and does not change color upon bruising.

The stem is 8 to 22 cm (3 to 8 1/2 in) long and 1 to 2 cm (1/2 to 1 in) thick. Unlike many other Amanitas with stems that are swollen at the base (bulbous), the thickness of the stem is about the same at both ends. The stem surface is covered with a finely powdered bloom (pruinose), especially near the top; faint longitudinal lines may be seen. The base of the stem is enclosed in a loose, sack-like volva that may discolor grayish or reddish brown. The spore print is white.

The variant A. vaginata var. alba is pure white, and has a volva that is either absent, or not constricted around the base of the stem.

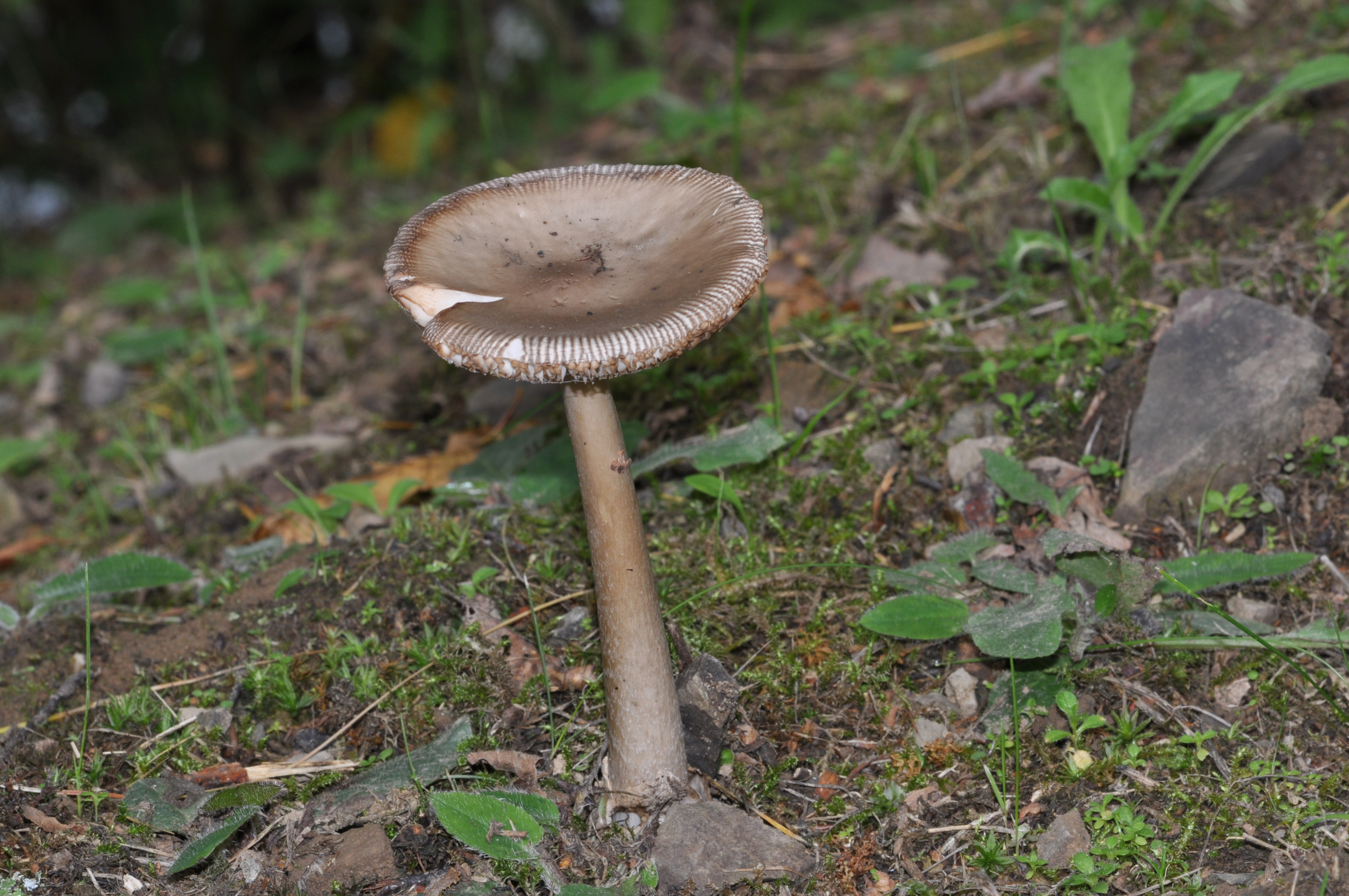

=== Microscopic features ===
The spores are roughly spherical, 8–12 μm in diameter, thin-walled, and nonamyloid (that is, not absorbing iodine stain in Melzer's reagent). The pileipellis (cap cuticle) is composed of filamentous interwoven hyphae, 2–7 μm diameter, gelatinized. The spore-bearing cells, the basidia, are 36–52 by 4–13 μm, 4–sterigmate, without clamps. The volva is largely made of filamentous hyphae, 2–8 μm diameter, inflated cells broadly elliptic, elliptical, fusiform, to clavate, 40–85 by 10–35 μm, mostly terminal. The stem tissue is made up of filamentous hyphae with diameters of 2–6 μm; the inflated cells are terminal, club-shaped, longitudinally oriented, with dimensions of up to 289 by 31 μm.

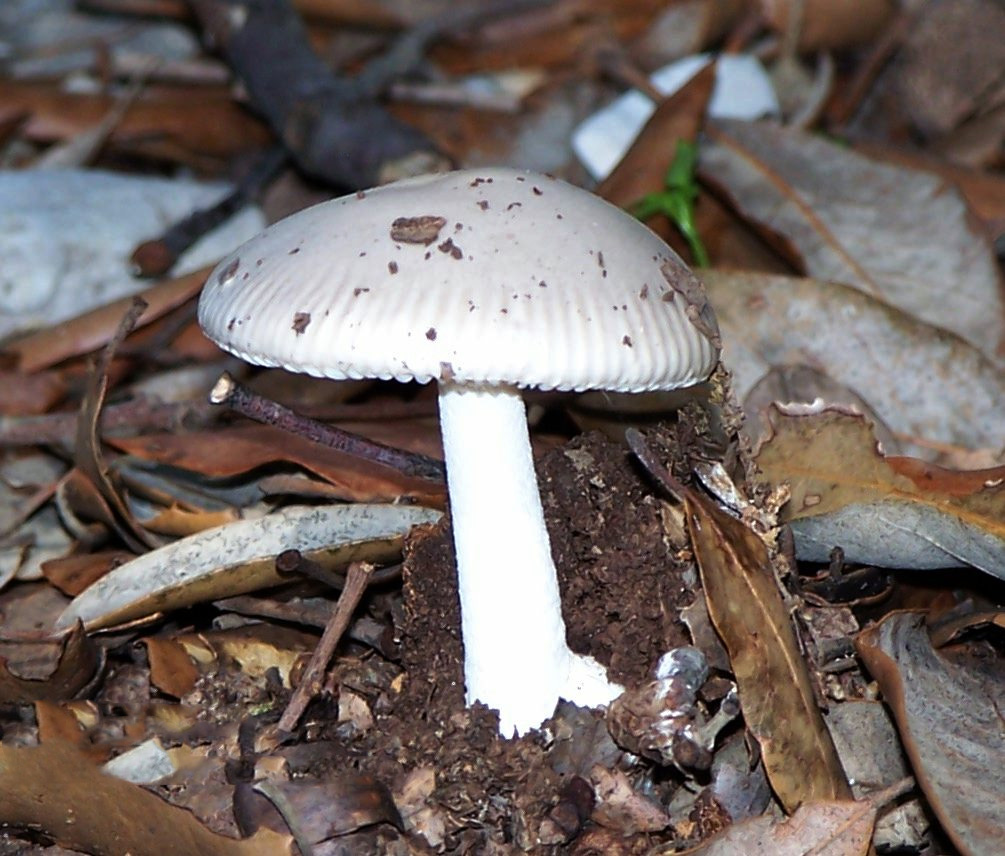

=== Similar species ===
The tawny grisette (Amanita fulva) was once thought to be a variety of A. vaginata. In North America, A. vaginata is considered to be part of a species complex that includes A. constricta, A. pachycolea and A. protecta.

== Distribution and habitat ==
This species is widely distributed in North America. It is also found in the Azores, Australia, Iran and Scotland.

A mycorrhizal species, A. vaginata grows singly or numerous in both coniferous and hardwood forests. It has also been noted to occur frequently in grassy areas at the edge of forests, unkempt lawns, and suburban area where the ground has been recently disturbed. A widely distributed and common species, it fruits from the spring to the fall.

== Ecology ==
This species has been recorded as an occasional food of adults of the pleasing fungus beetles Tritoma biguttata biguttata, T.erythrocephala and T.humeralis (which may be conspecific), and T.mimetica. One field guide notes that cows enjoy eating this mushroom.

== Edibility ==
Although not poisonous, most authors advise against consumption due to the possibility of mistaking it with poisonous species of Amanita.
