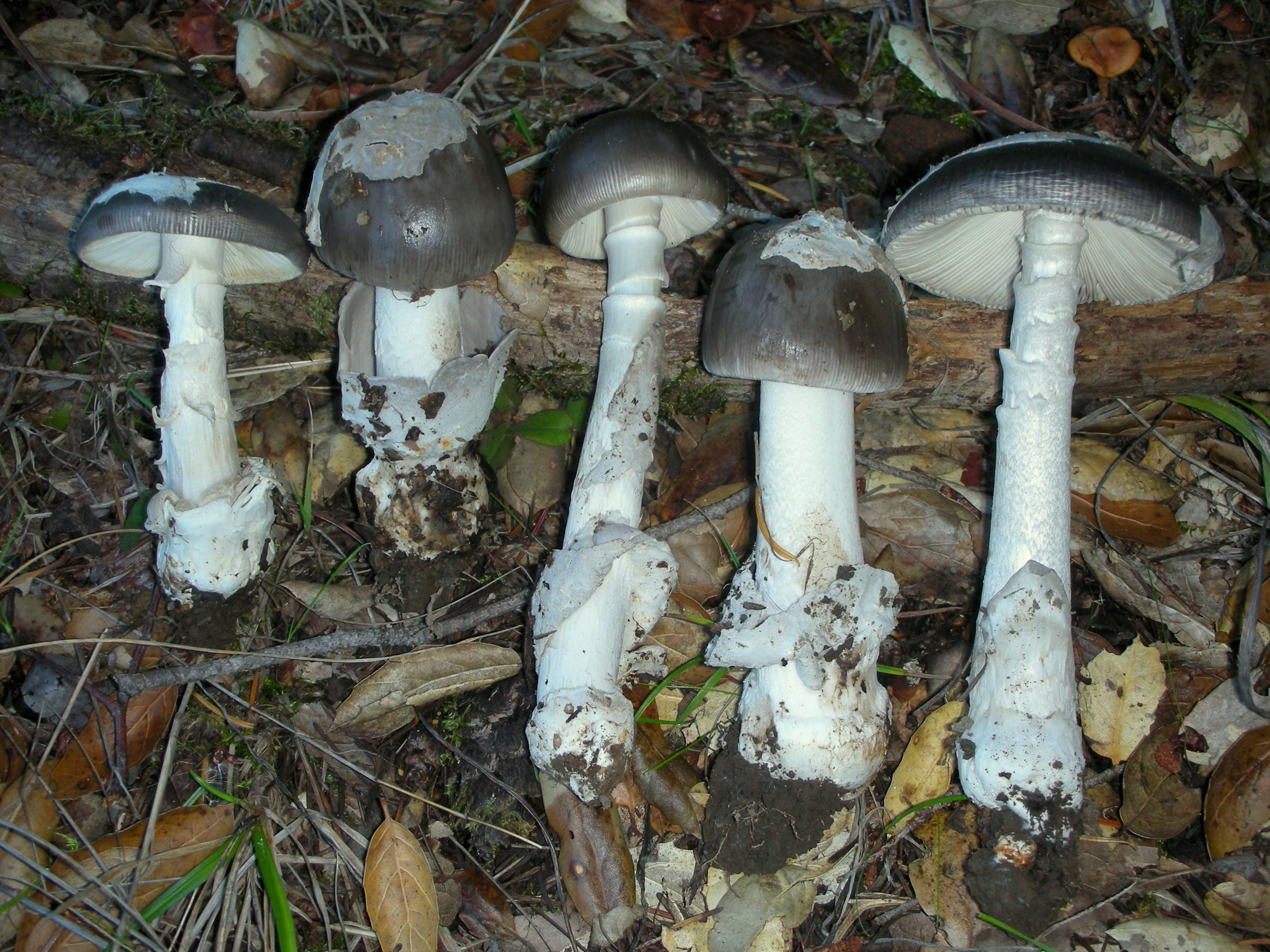

Scientific classification
- Kingdom: Fungi
- Division: Basidiomycota
- Class: Agaricomycetes
- Order: Agaricales
- Family: Amanitaceae
- Genus: Amanita
- Species: A. constricta

Binomial name
- Amanita constricta Theirs & Ammirati (1982)

= Amanita constricta =

Species of fungus

Amanita constricta Mycological characteristics
- Gills on hymenium
- Cap is convex or flat
- Hymenium is adnexed
- Stipe has a volva
- Spore print is white
- Ecology is mycorrhizal
- Edibility is not recommended

Amanita constricta, commonly known as the constricted grisette or great grey-sack ringless amanita is a species of mushroom-forming fungus in the family Amanitaceae.

== Description ==
Amanita constricta has a brown cap that is about 5–15 centimetres (2–6 in) wide. The stipe is about 8–15 cm (3 1/4–6 in) tall and about 1–2.5 cm (1/2–1 in) wide. The mushroom has a volva that tightly attaches to the stipe.

Amanita inaurata is closely related.

== Habitat and ecology ==
Amanita constricta is mycorrhizal, and grows under oak and Douglas-fir. It was originally described from California, but its range may extend up into Canada.

== Edibility ==
It is edible, but it is not recommended for consumption due to confusion with poisonous species.
