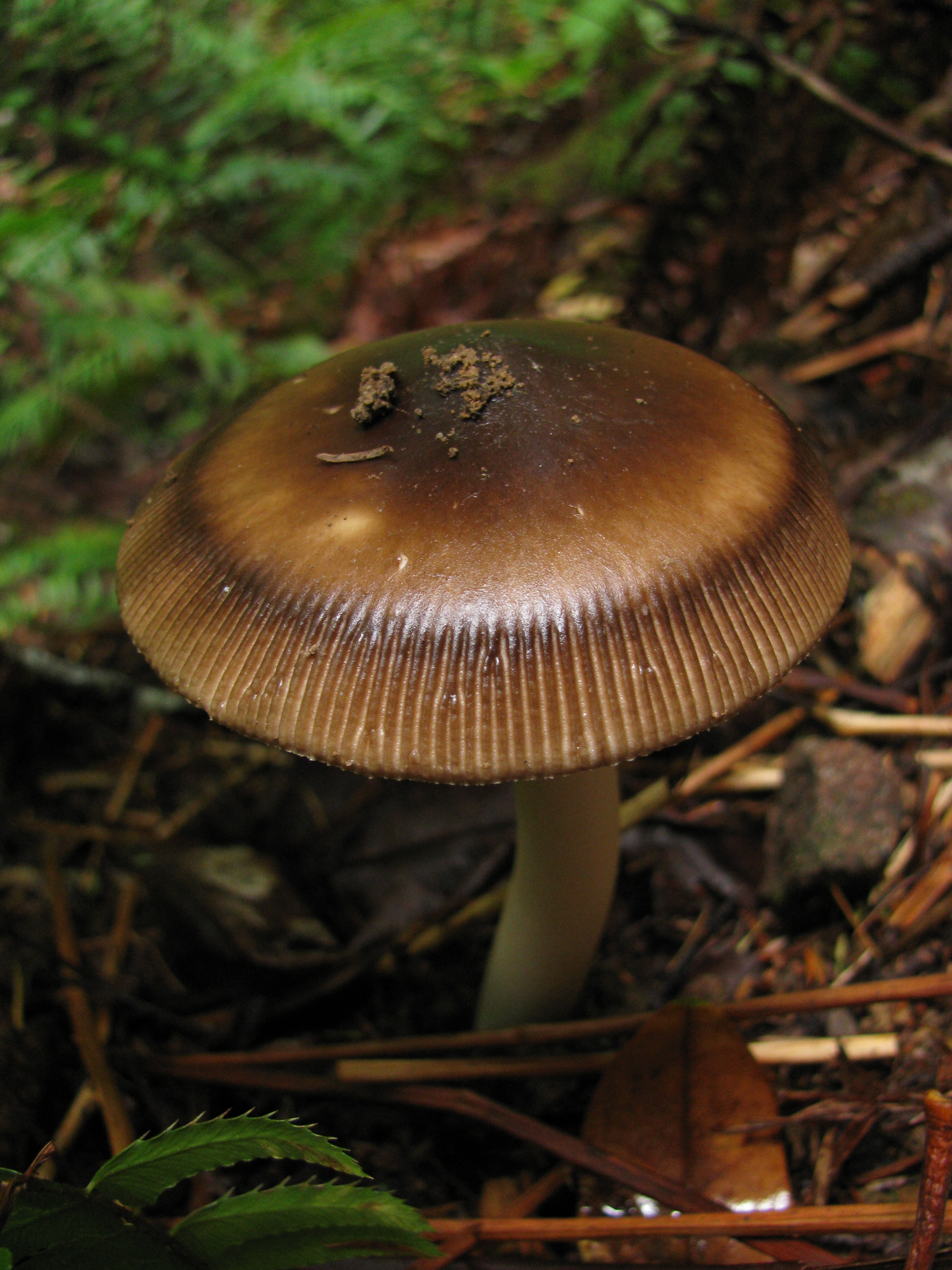

Scientific classification
- Kingdom: Fungi
- Division: Basidiomycota
- Class: Agaricomycetes
- Order: Agaricales
- Family: Amanitaceae
- Genus: Amanita
- Species: A. pachycolea

Binomial name
- Amanita pachycolea D.E.Stuntz (1982)

= Amanita pachycolea =

Species of fungus

Amanita pachycolea
- Mycological characteristics
- Gills on hymenium
- Cap is campanulate
- Hymenium is free or adnate
- Stipe has a volva
- Spore print is white
- Ecology is mycorrhizal
- Edibility is not recommended

Amanita pachycolea, commonly known as the western grisette or the Stuntz's great ringless amanita, is a species of agaric fungus in the family Amanitaceae.

The cap is brown, sometimes lighter near the margin. The gills are white with gray-brown edges, staining orange-brown in age. The stipe is white to brownish with a fibrillose or scaly surface. The base is enclosed by a thick, felty volva, which is white in youth, then yellow or brownish, sometimes becoming reddish in age.

A. pachycolea was recognized as a distinct species by mycologist Daniel Elliot Stuntz, and published in 1982 by Harry Delbert Thiers. It is classified in Amanita section Vaginatae, which includes species with conspicuous radial striations on the cap (8–20 centimetres or 3–8 inches wide), inamyloid spores, and the absence of a ring on the stipe (10–25 cm long, 1–3 cm wide, tapering upward).

Found in western North America, it associates with conifers in coniferous and mixed forests. The mushroom is edible, but not choice and also not recommended due to possible confusion with toxic Amanita species.

== See also ==
- List of Amanita species
