= Tritoma humeralis =

Scientific classification
- Kingdom: Animalia
- Phylum: Arthropoda
- Clade: Pancrustacea
- Class: Insecta
- Order: Coleoptera
- Suborder: Polyphaga
- Infraorder: Cucujiformia
- Family: Erotylidae
- Genus: Tritoma
- Species: T. humeralis

Binomial name
- Tritoma humeralis Fabricius, 1801

Synonyms
- Cyrtotriplax humeralis (Fabricius, 1801); Tritoma ornata Casey, 1916; Tritoma ruficeps LeConte, 1847; Tritoma taeniata LeConte, 1847; Tritoma vittata LeConte, 1847

Species of beetle

Tritoma humeralis is a North American species of small pleasing fungus beetle (family Erotylidae). It belongs to subfamily Tritominae, or – in taxonomic arrangements that prefer a more comprehensive subfamily Erotylinae – in tribe Tritomini of the Erotylinae.

This species is probably very closely related to T.atriventris, T.erythrocephala, and the disputed T.aulica; they differ little except in color pattern, and might form a species complex or even be subspecies or mere morphs of one single species.

== Description ==
This is a tiny beetle, about 2.4-4.2 mm long and 1.5-2.6 mm wide as adults, widely oval in shape with somewhat pointed wingtips. They are mostly black, with a slightly lighter top of the base of the head and tip to the abdomen. The elytra, which are ornamented with regular lines of small punctuations, each have a large orange-red spot on the "shoulder"; the legs and the "stalks" of the antennae are also orange, with the coxae and trochanters of the legs often darker. The "club" of the antenna is dark chestnut-brown. The "shoulder" spot typically extends rearwards for up to one-third of the elytron; towards the center, it reaches as far as the third puncture-stripe when fully formed, and on the wing bases the spots' color extends around the elytron edge to the underside. As typical for Tritoma sensu stricto, T.humeralis has a triangular mentum, as well as an epistome whose tip is sharply cut off, causing the line running parallel to the epistome margin to angle towards the antennae insertions.

Overall, T.humeralis look very similar to T.biguttata, which has an orange underside however. There is also considerable variation in the adults' pattern, exacerbated by possible interbreeding with the close relatives mentioned above. In some individuals, the wing spots are reduced to half the usual size. Others have the spots widely smeared out towards the wingtip; these have been described as supposed species "T.vittata" and "T.ornata". Even in individuals of the typical form, different parts of the carapace seem to mature at different times after emergence from the pupa, with the head capsule and the pleura remaining orange when the rest of the dark carapace has already fully hardened and darkened. Such orange-headed specimens were named "T.ruficeps", and those who were almost fully mature "T.taeniata". While the former two might be considered distinct forms, the latter two are merely developmental stages which occur in all individuals of this species.

Head
The head has small compound eyes have tiny ommatidia, indicating a diurnal or crepuscular lifestyle, but with overall rather little reliance on eyesight. Its surface covered in sparsely strewn small and slightly indistinct punctures. Adults possess file-like structures at the sides of the neck attachment, which, when the beetle wiggles its head, rub against the chitin and produce a squeaking sound; the degree of development of these structures is unreliable for distinguishing males and females. The epistome has a narrow but unbroken angled margin around the straight tip; a transverse stripe separates the margin from the bulk of the epistome. The "cheek" lobes below the compound eyes are vestigial, do not reach to the lower edge of the eyes, and are hidden by the ends of the maxillary palps. The antenna length is less than half of the pronotal base width, with antenna segment 3 almost as long as the segments 4 and 5 together, and a "clubbed" antenna tip which is about half again as long as it is wide.

The galea and lacinia of the maxilla resemble those of the related genera Ischyrus and Pseudischyrus; those of Triplax are also similar except for having two small curved teeth at the tip of the lacinia. The maxillary palps have an end segment that is rounded, somewhat triangular, and a bit more than half as long as it is wide. It does not seem to carry a brush, but there might be a vestigial brush hidden within a slit at the tip. The labium has a mentum that is mid-sized and fairly narrowly triangular. The labial palps end in a narrow segment with a strong bristle at the outer side and a tiny brush at the tip.

Body, wings and legs
The prothorax is almost as wide at the base as the wings at their widest point, and has the same pattern of punctures as the head in center, with slightly denser punctures to the sides. The pronotum is fairly wide and trapezoid-shaped, with the rear edge more than half again as long as the forward edge. A thin margin runs around the sides and front of the pronotum, but is absent from the rear. In each corner of the pronotum, there is a small and inconspicuous pore. The prosternum is bell-shaped, with lengthwise lines at the center margin of the leg attachments extending to the forward edge of the prosternum and sharply curving towards each other in front of the leg attachments.

On the metasternum, the lines between the leg attachments are clearly engraved, and extend to about halfway between the rear edge of the leg attachment and the side of the metasternum. The scutellum is bluntly heart-shaped. The elytra lack a distinct margin at the base, except for a very slim margin in front of the "shoulders".

The attachments of each leg pair are widely separated. The tibiae are only slightly widened towards the ends; their upper/outer edge is narrowed to a very thin "razor edge" towards the tip. Segment 4 of the tarsi is reduced, and attached to the upper centerside of segment 3.

On the abdomen, coxal lines are present, and the intercoxal process is wide and has a cut-off or slightly rounded tip. Males and females do not have conspicuously different external abdominal structures. The aedeagus of the male genitalia resembles Pseudischyrus. The tegminal arms are firmly joined at the forward end, form a tooth-like lobe on the upper sides just in front of the basal piece, and have a narrow and almost membranous section below. The median strut does not exceed the median lobe in length. The internal sac is short and entirely hidden within the sclerotized median lobe; its anterior end lacks conspicuous point-like muscle attachments. The ejaculatory duct does not continue into the internal sac. The female genitalia are conspicuously shortened, but all parts are present and functional. Only the proctigeral and vulvar lobes are close to the typical size in Erotylidae; at the eighth abdominal segment, the genital tube has short and weakly sclerotized lines. The seminal receptacle is small, rounded, and bears a short well-sclerotized arm.

== Distribution and ecology ==
The type locality of this species is the region of "Carolina" as understood around 1800, today distributed among the US States North Carolina, South Carolina and Tennessee. In general, T.humeralis occurs in North America east of the Rocky Mountains, from New England to Quebec, Ontario and Minnesota in the north, and in the south from South Carolina through northern Georgia, Alabama, Arkansas and possibly Texas. The western limit is Iowa, Kansas and Nebraska (where it was first collected in 1989, and subsequently proved to be common in the Fontenelle Forest). It is absent from the Gulf of Mexico coast and does not seem to occur naturally in Florida and Louisiana, while its presence in northern Mississippi is uncertain but likely. Unfortunately, the records from the limits of its range are few and vague, often with nondescript collection localities as "Minnesota", "South Carolina" and "Texas". In Arkansas, it occurs south at least to Lee County, and it ranges into Canada at least to Ottawa. The westernmost records are Onaga, Kansas, on the Middle Loup River between Walworth and Sargent, Nebraska, and Guthrie and Madison Counties in Iowa.

This species loves warmth; in Fontanelle Forest, for example, it is easily collected with Malaise traps between mid-May and the end of August, but much rarer at other times. Across its range, it is generally most plentiful from June/July to September, but it has been collected in April in Onaga (Kansas), Southern Pines (North Carolina) and Madison (Tennessee), and in mid-October in Lee County (Arkansas). Larvae and pupae of T.humeralis are easily found, but remain almost unstudied. T.humeralis is notable for being more tolerant of competing species than its relatives, probably courtesy of its more indiscriminate feeding habits. It is often found together with T.biguttata and T.mimetica on gilled fungi, as well as with Rotitma sanguinipennis (formerly also placed in Tritoma) on polypores.

Individuals of the red-headed tritoma (T.erythrocephala) are also frequently found on the same fungus as T.humeralis, but the situation with these seems to be different: In Kansas, the more southernly T.atriventris is also found as part of such groups; furthermore, the enigmatic T.aulica occurs in this area too, also often associated with the preceding three taxa – and its coloration is intermediate between T.humeralis and T.atriventris. Given that their genitalia – a main factor upholding reproductive isolation in beetles – are essentially alike, allowing each to mate with the other two (or three), this suggests that they are not distinct species. However, T.humeralis seems to have less strict food preferences than the others.

=== Food ===
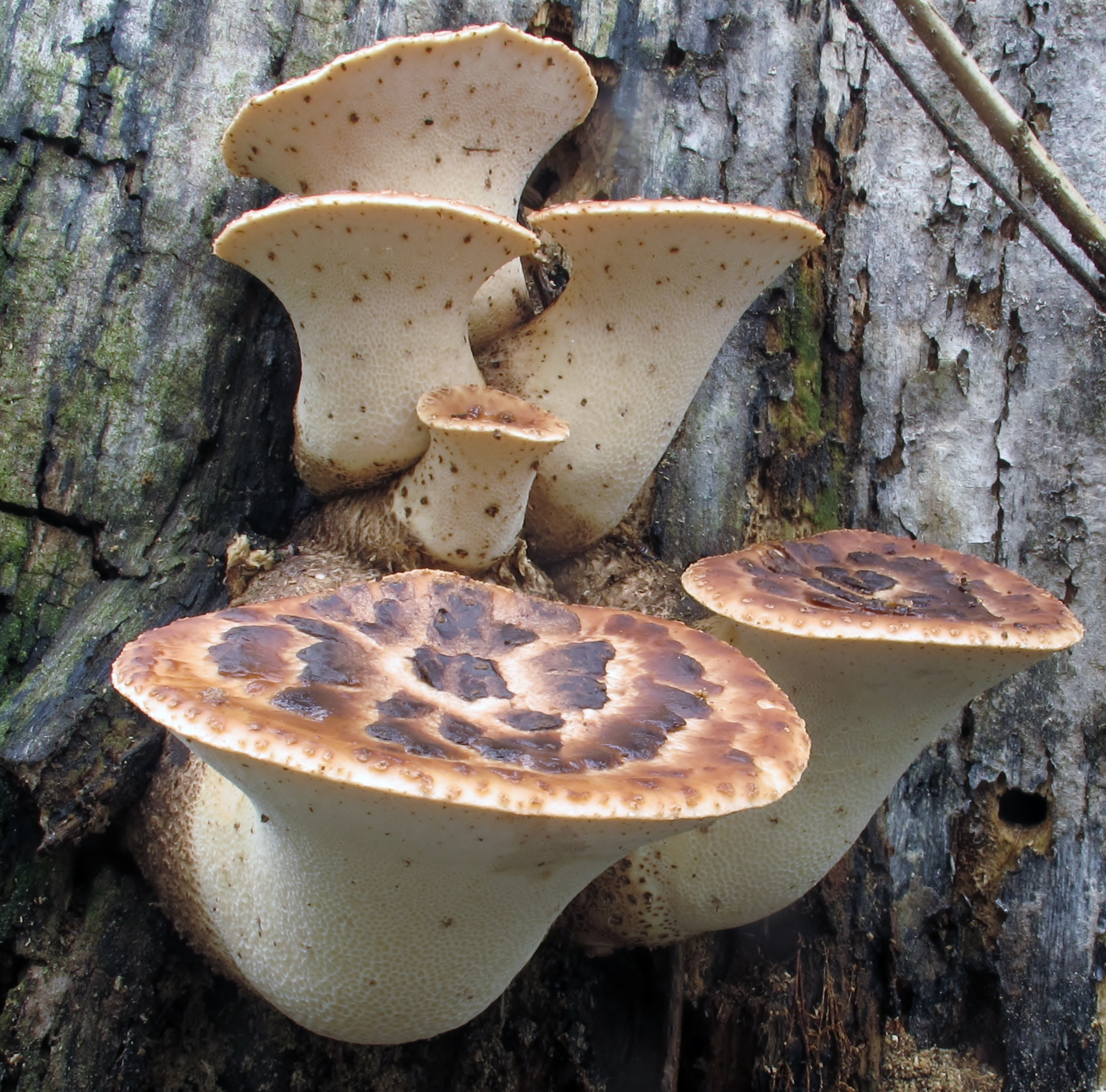
A favorite food of T.humeralis: Dryad's saddles (Beaver Creek State Park, Ohio)

This beetle eats Agaricomycetes fungi as larva and adults, with less strict preferences than most of their relatives. Not only do they eat gilled fungi like other Tritoma sensu stricto, but they are just as often found on polypores (shelf fungi). Most commonly, they are found on the erstwhile genus "Polyporus sensu lato" – which is nowadays split up into several genera of family Polyporaceae in order Polyporales –, and on honey mushroom (Armillaria) and related genera of family Physalacriaceae in order Agaricales. Specifically, spring polypore Lentinus arcularius, dryad's saddle (Cerioporus squamosus), and the ringless honey mushroom (Desarmillaria tabescens, formerly in Armillaria) have been reported as most important food sources of T.humeralis, and the genus Pluteus (family Pluteaceae) has also been noted as suitable larval food.

Adults have less strict food requirements than larvae and occasionally utilize other fungi, such as the Polyporaceae Polyporus radicatus, and among the Agaricales the grisette amanita (Amanita vaginata) of family Amanitaceae, the honey mushroom Armillaria mellea (or a close relative), and perhaps the common mycena (Mycena galericulata) of family Mycenaceae.

Sporadic records of T.humeralis exist from the Agaricales eastern destroying angel (Amanita bisporigera), Gymnopus dryophilus of family Omphalotaceae, an undetermined species of Xeromphalina in family Mycenaceae, and undeterminable putative Clitocybaceae ambiguously named as "Clitocybe maxima" and "Collybia sp.". The hexagonal-pored polypore (Neofavolus alveolaris) of the Polyporaceae &ndash: or N.americanus, if this is considered a distinct species – as well as Schizopora paradoxa of family Schizoporaceae in order Hymenochaetales have also been associated with T.humeralis. None of those occasional records, however, necessarily imply that the beetles were actually feeding on those fungus species rather than simply sheltering there, or that the fungus in question was correctly identified.
