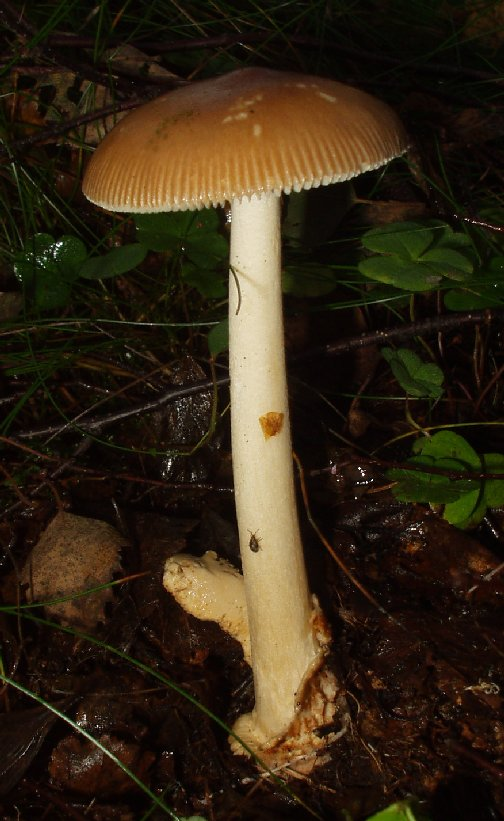

Scientific classification
- Kingdom: Fungi
- Division: Basidiomycota
- Class: Agaricomycetes
- Order: Agaricales
- Family: Amanitaceae
- Genus: Amanita
- Species: A. fulva

Binomial name
- Amanita fulva (Schaeff.) Secr.

Synonyms
- Agaricus fulvus Schäff.; Amanita vaginata var. fulva (Fr.) Gillet; Amanitopsis fulva (Fr.) W.G. Sm.

= Amanita fulva =

Species of fungus

Amanita fulva
- Mycological characteristics
- Gills on hymenium
- Cap is umbonate
- Hymenium is free
- Stipe has a volva
- Spore print is white
- Ecology is mycorrhizal
- Edibility is edible but not recommended

Amanita fulva, commonly called the tawny grisette or the orange-brown ringless amanita, is a basidiomycete mushroom of the genus Amanita. It is found frequently in deciduous and coniferous forests of Europe and possibly North America.

== Taxonomy ==
Amanita fulva was first described by Jacob Christian Schäffer in 1774. Historically, both the tawny grisette and the grisette (A. vaginata) were placed in the genus Amanitopsis due to their lack of a ring, unlike other Amanita species. However this distinction is now seen as insufficient to warrant a separate genus. Today, A. fulva and similar ringless Amanitas are placed in the section Vaginatae according to the classification of Bas.

== Description ==
A membranous universal veil initially encapsulates the fruiting body, which develops into a white, sacklike volva with rusty-brown blemishes. Whitish veil remnants rarely remain on the cap, which is otherwise smooth with a strongly striated margin. It is up to 10 centimetres (4 inches) in diameter, convex to plane or umbonate, and orange-brown to reddish-tan. It is viscid when moist.

The gills are free, close, and broad. The flesh is white to cream. The stem or stipe is white and smooth or powdery, sometimes tinged with orange-brown and with very fine hairs. It is slender, ringless, hollow and quite fragile, tapering towards the top; up to 15 cm tall and 1–1.5 cm in thickness.

The spores are white, 9 × 12 μm or (9.0-) 10.0–12.5 (-19.3) x (8.2-) 9.3–12.0 (-15.5) μm in size, globose; nonamyloid.

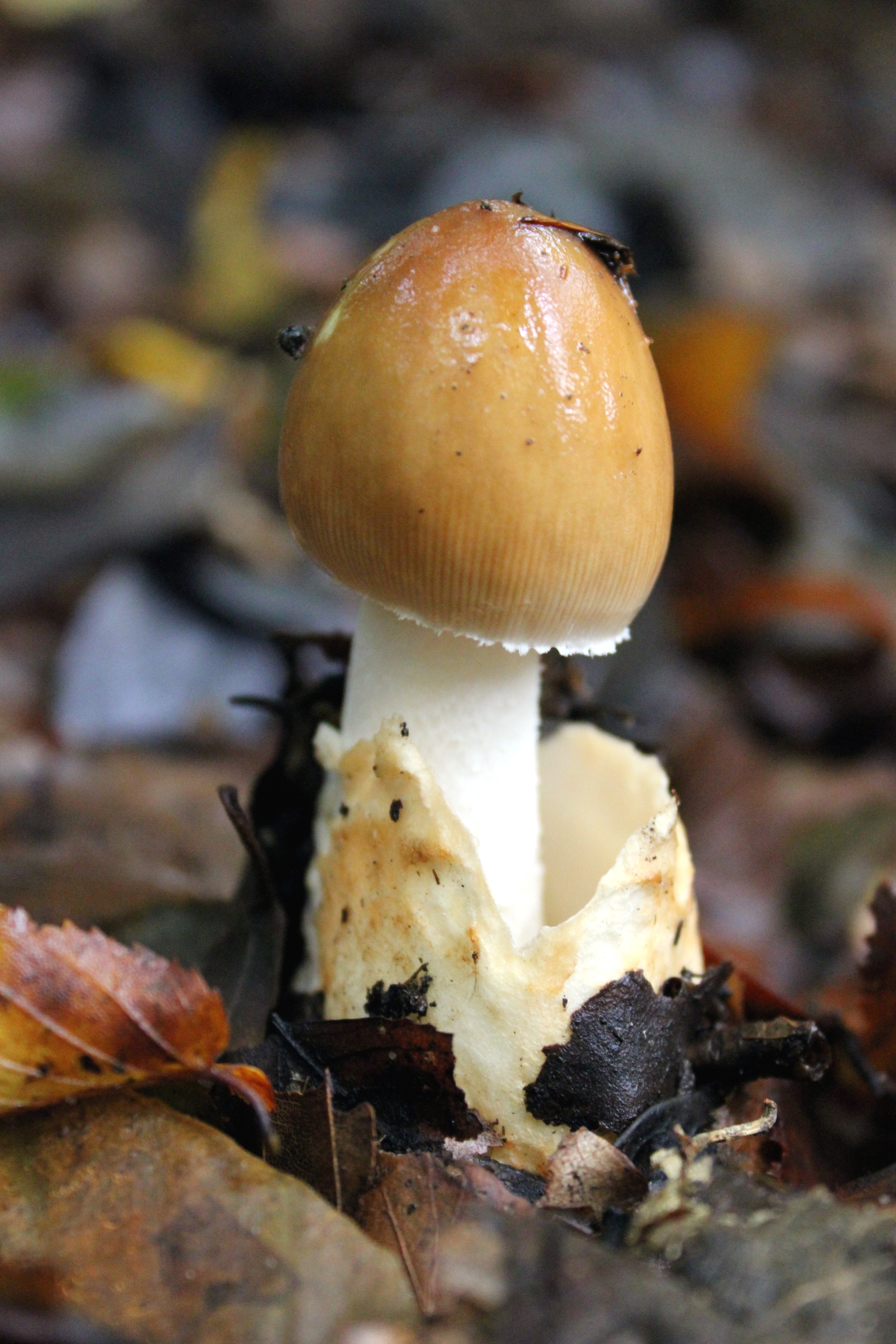
Emergent specimen

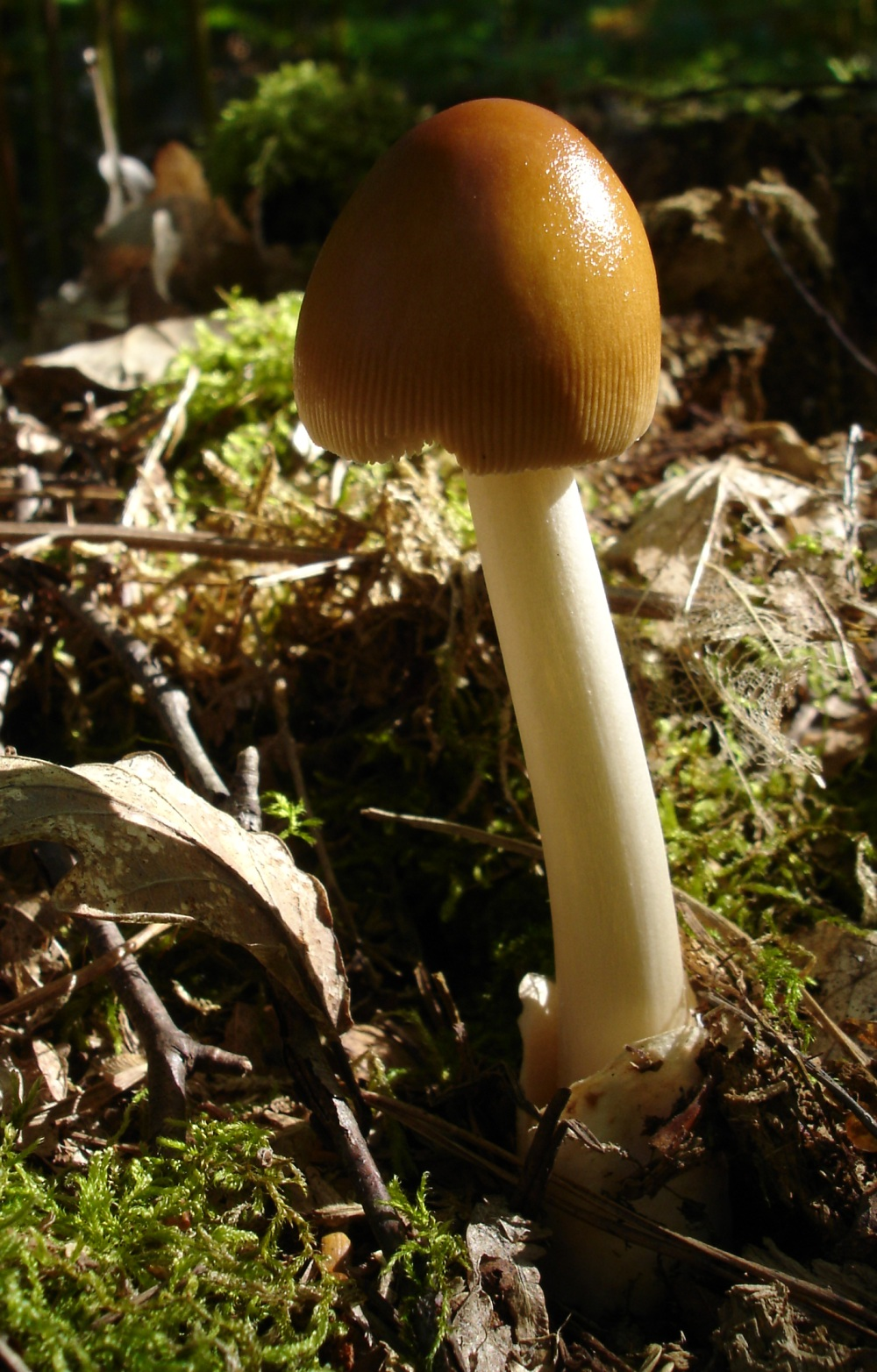
Immature specimen

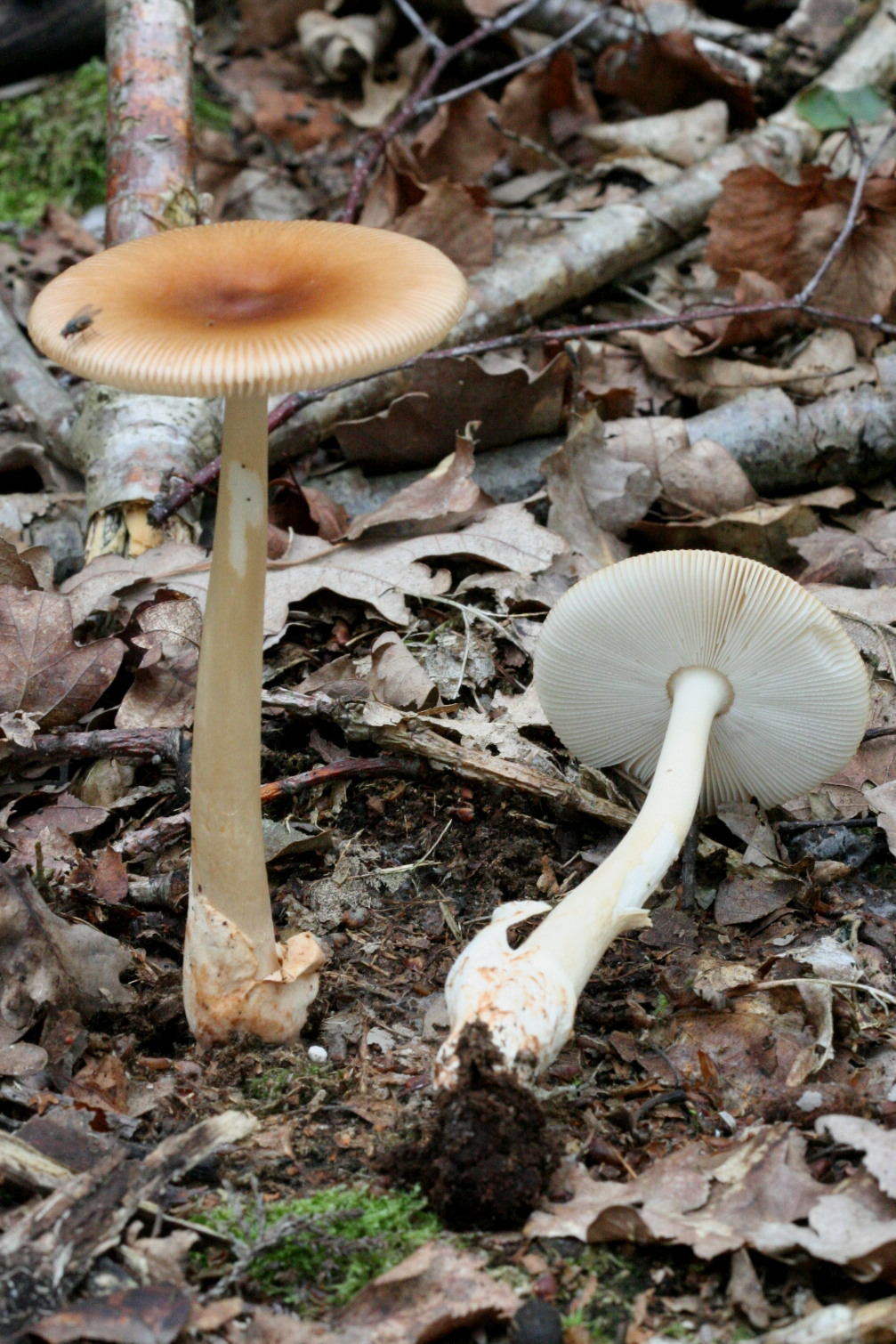
Mature specimens

=== Similar species ===
A. vaginata is very similar, but is not as fulvous in color.

== Distribution and ecology ==
Amanita fulva, distributed throughout Europe, occurs in a variety of forests. It is generally found with oak, birch, spruce, pine, chestnut and alder, forming mycorrhizae. It is often found with birch in Scandinavia, while collections from southern Europe are usually from forests of oak, chestnut and pine. It grows in acidic soils and fruits from summer to late autumn (May to November in the United Kingdom). It is a common to scarce fungus and is very common in Britain.

Amanita fulva is considered to be widely distributed in North America in deciduous and coniferous forests, although collections could possibly be of a different, yet undescribed species. Additionally, the name A. fulva has previously been misapplied to other North American taxa, such as A. amerifulva and others.

Adults of the pleasing fungus beetle Tritoma mimetica have been recorded from this mushroom (or perhaps from A. amerifulva), but it does not seem to be a regular food source for them.

== Edibility ==
Although this Amanita fulva is considered edible, it must be identified with care as some other members of the genus Amanita are poisonous and a few can be deadly. For this reason, consuming A. fulva can be dangerous and is not recommended. It is potentially toxic when raw and suitable for consumption only after cooking.

== See also ==
- List of Amanita species
