= Gymnopilus depressus =

Scientific classification
- Kingdom: Fungi
- Division: Basidiomycota
- Class: Agaricomycetes
- Order: Agaricales
- Family: Hymenogastraceae
- Genus: Gymnopilus
- Species: G. depressus

Binomial name
- Gymnopilus depressus Murrill

Species of fungus

Gymnopilus depressus Mycological characteristics
- Gills on hymenium
- Cap is convex
- Hymenium is adnexed or adnate
- Ecology is saprotrophic

Gymnopilus depressus is a species of mushroom in the family Hymenogastraceae.

== Description ==
The cap is 8 to 10 centimetres (3.1 to 3.9 in) in diameter.

== Habitat and distribution ==
Gymnopilus depressus fruits on logs, and has been found in Jamaica in November.

== See also ==
List of Gymnopilus species
