= Gymnopilus rugulosus =

Scientific classification
- Kingdom: Fungi
- Division: Basidiomycota
- Class: Agaricomycetes
- Order: Agaricales
- Family: Hymenogastraceae
- Genus: Gymnopilus
- Species: G. rugulosus

Binomial name
- Gymnopilus rugulosus R. Valenz., Guzmán & J. Castillo

Species of fungus

Gymnopilus rugulosus
- Mycological characteristics
- Gills on hymenium
- Cap is convex
- Hymenium is adnexed or adnate
- Ecology is saprotrophic

Gymnopilus rugulosus is a species of mushroom in the family Hymenogastraceae.

== Phylogeny ==
This species is in the spectabilis-imperialis infrageneric grouping of the genus Gymnopilus.

== See also ==
- List of Gymnopilus species
