= Gymnopilus turficola =

Scientific classification
- Kingdom: Fungi
- Division: Basidiomycota
- Class: Agaricomycetes
- Order: Agaricales
- Family: Hymenogastraceae
- Genus: Gymnopilus
- Species: G. turficola

Binomial name
- Gymnopilus turficola M.M.Moser & H.Ladurner (2001)

Species of fungus

Gymnopilus turficola is a species of agaric fungus in the family Hymenogastraceae.

== Habitat and distribution ==
It can be found growing in peat in subarctic tundra in northern Finland and in Finnmark, Norway.

== See also ==
- List of Gymnopilus species
