= Gymnopilus yangshanensis =

Scientific classification
- Kingdom: Fungi
- Division: Basidiomycota
- Class: Agaricomycetes
- Order: Agaricales
- Family: Hymenogastraceae
- Genus: Gymnopilus
- Species: G. yangshanensis

Binomial name
- Gymnopilus yangshanensis Z.S.Bi (1990)

Species of fungus

Gymnopilus yangshanensis is a species of mushroom in the family Hymenogastraceae found in China.

== See also ==
- List of Gymnopilus species
