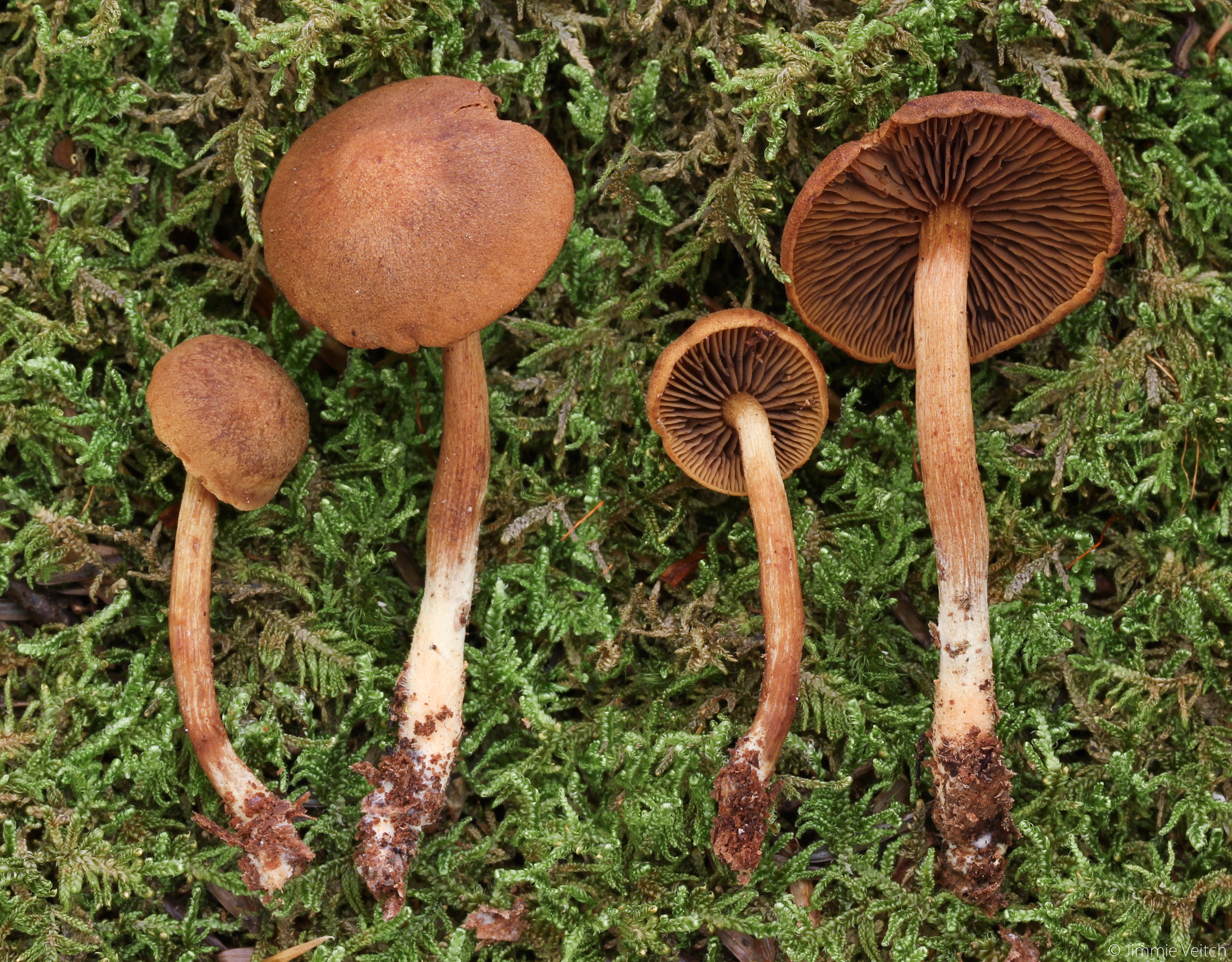

Scientific classification
- Kingdom: Fungi
- Division: Basidiomycota
- Class: Agaricomycetes
- Order: Agaricales
- Family: Hymenogastraceae
- Genus: Gymnopilus
- Species: G. josserandii

Binomial name
- Gymnopilus josserandii Antonín

= Gymnopilus josserandii =

Species of mushroom

Gymnopilus josserandii Mycological characteristics
- Gills on hymenium
- Cap is convex
- Hymenium is adnexed or adnate
- Stipe is bare
- Spore print is ochre
- Ecology is saprotrophic
- Edibility is unknown

Gymnopilus josserandii is a species of mushroom in the family Hymenogastraceae. It is a rare species, with instances documented in France, Switzerland and the Netherlands, with a noticeable lack of reports from the United Kingdom and Norway.

== See also ==
List of Gymnopilus species
