= Gymnopilus medius =

Scientific classification
- Kingdom: Fungi
- Division: Basidiomycota
- Class: Agaricomycetes
- Order: Agaricales
- Family: Hymenogastraceae
- Genus: Gymnopilus
- Species: G. medius

Binomial name
- Gymnopilus medius Guzm.-Dáv.

Species of fungus

Gymnopilus medius
- Mycological characteristics
- Gills on hymenium
- Cap is convex

Gymnopilus medius is a species of mushroom in the family Hymenogastraceae.

== Phylogeny ==
G. medius is in the lepidotus-subearlei grouping of the genus Gymnopilus.

== See also ==
- List of Gymnopilus species
