= Gymnopilus aurantiacus =

Scientific classification
- Kingdom: Fungi
- Division: Basidiomycota
- Class: Agaricomycetes
- Order: Agaricales
- Family: Hymenogastraceae
- Genus: Gymnopilus
- Species: G. aurantiacus

Binomial name
- Gymnopilus aurantiacus Hesler (1969)

Species of fungus

Gymnopilus aurantiacus Mycological characteristics
- Gills on hymenium
- Cap is convex
- Hymenium is adnexed or adnate
- Ecology is saprotrophic

Gymnopilus aurantiacus is a species of mushroom-forming fungus in the family Hymenogastraceae.

== Description ==
The cap is 3 cm (1.2 in) in diameter.

== Habitat and distribution ==
Gymnopilus aurantiacus grows on conifer wood. Fruiting in July, it has been collected in Maine.

== See also ==
- List of Gymnopilus species
