= Gymnopilus intermedius =

Scientific classification
- Kingdom: Fungi
- Division: Basidiomycota
- Class: Agaricomycetes
- Order: Agaricales
- Family: Hymenogastraceae
- Genus: Gymnopilus
- Species: G. intermedius

Binomial name
- Gymnopilus intermedius (Singer) Singer (1951)

Synonyms
- Pholiota intermedia Singer (1929)

Species of fungus

Gymnopilus intermedius Mycological characteristics
- Gills on hymenium
- Cap is convex
- Hymenium is adnexed or adnate
- Ecology is saprotrophic

Gymnopilus intermedius is a species of mushroom-forming fungus in the family Hymenogastraceae. It was described by mycologist Rolf Singer in 1951.

== See also ==
- List of Gymnopilus species
