= Gymnopilus terrestris =

Scientific classification
- Domain: Eukaryota
- Kingdom: Fungi
- Division: Basidiomycota
- Class: Agaricomycetes
- Order: Agaricales
- Family: Hymenogastraceae
- Genus: Gymnopilus
- Species: G. terrestris

Binomial name
- Gymnopilus terrestris Hesler (1969)

Gymnopilus terrestris Mycological characteristics
- Gills on hymenium
- Cap is convex
- Hymenium is adnexed or adnate
- Ecology is saprotrophic
- Edibility is inedible

Gymnopilus terrestris is a species of agaric fungus in the family Hymenogastraceae.

== Description ==
The cap is 3 to 7 centimetres (1.2 to 2.8 in) in diameter. The species is inedible.

== Distribution and habitat ==
Gymnopilus terrestris grows on soil and humus, under conifers. It has been found in the US states of Michigan, Colorado, Idaho, Washington, and Oregon, fruiting from June to October.

== See also ==
- List of Gymnopilus species
