= Gymnopilus praelaeticolor =

Scientific classification
- Kingdom: Fungi
- Division: Basidiomycota
- Class: Agaricomycetes
- Order: Agaricales
- Family: Hymenogastraceae
- Genus: Gymnopilus
- Species: G. praelaeticolor

Binomial name
- Gymnopilus praelaeticolor Murrill

Species of fungus

Gymnopilus praelaeticolor Mycological characteristics
- Gills on hymenium
- Cap is convex
- Hymenium is adnexed or adnate
- Ecology is saprotrophic

Gymnopilus praelaeticolor is a species of mushroom in the family Hymenogastraceae.

== Description ==
The cap is 6 to 8 centimetres (2.4 to 3.1 in) in diameter.

== Habitat and distribution ==
Gymnopilus praelaeticolor grows on laurel-oak stumps. It has been found in Florida, in June.

== See also ==
- List of Gymnopilus species
