= Gymnopilus naucorioides =

Scientific classification
- Kingdom: Fungi
- Division: Basidiomycota
- Class: Agaricomycetes
- Order: Agaricales
- Family: Hymenogastraceae
- Genus: Gymnopilus
- Species: G. naucorioides

Binomial name
- Gymnopilus naucorioides Hesler (1969)

Species of fungus

Gymnopilus naucorioides Mycological characteristics
- Gills on hymenium
- Cap is convex
- Hymenium is adnexed or adnate
- Ecology is saprotrophic

Gymnopilus naucorioides is a species of mushroom-forming fungus in the family Hymenogastraceae.

== Description ==
The cap is 2 to 5 centimetres (0.8 to 2.0 in) in diameter.

== Habitat and distribution ==
Gymnopilus naucorioides grows on hemlock. It has been collected in Tennessee, in August.

== See also ==
- List of Gymnopilus species
