= Gymnopilus lacticolor =

Scientific classification
- Kingdom: Fungi
- Division: Basidiomycota
- Class: Agaricomycetes
- Order: Agaricales
- Family: Hymenogastraceae
- Genus: Gymnopilus
- Species: G. lacticolor

Binomial name
- Gymnopilus lacticolor Murrill

Species of fungus

Gymnopilus lacticolor
- Mycological characteristics
- Gills on hymenium
- Cap is convex
- Hymenium is adnexed or adnate
- Ecology is saprotrophic

Gymnopilus lacticolor is a species of mushroom in the family Hymenogastraceae.

== See also ==
List of Gymnopilus species
