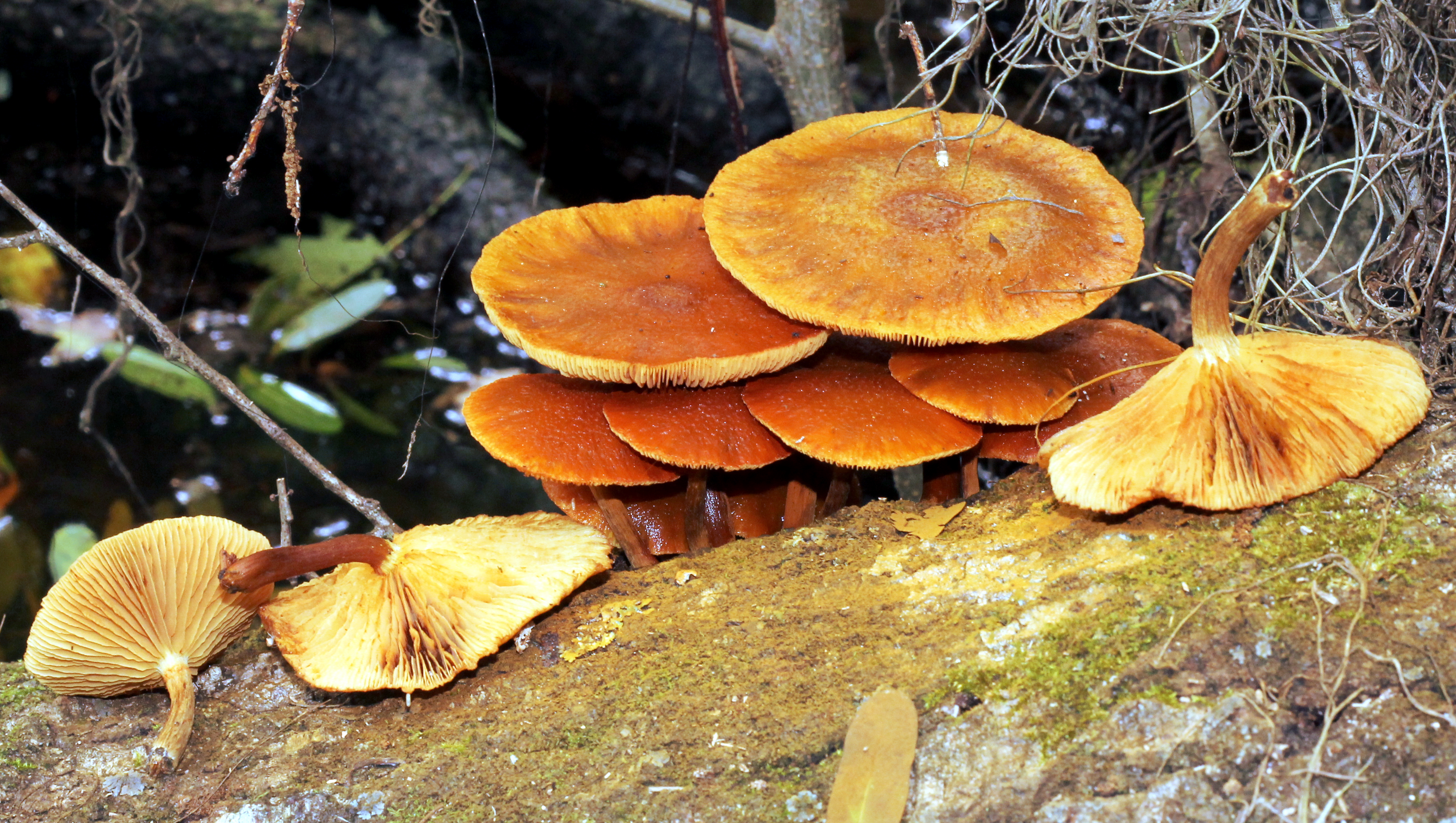

Scientific classification
- Domain: Eukaryota
- Kingdom: Fungi
- Division: Basidiomycota
- Class: Agaricomycetes
- Order: Agaricales
- Family: Hymenogastraceae
- Genus: Gymnopilus
- Species: G. dryophilus

Binomial name
- Gymnopilus dryophilus Murrill (1943)

= Gymnopilus dryophilus =

Species of fungus

Gymnopilus dryophilus is a species of mushroom in the family Hymenogastraceae. This species is found in North America.

== See also ==
List of Gymnopilus species
