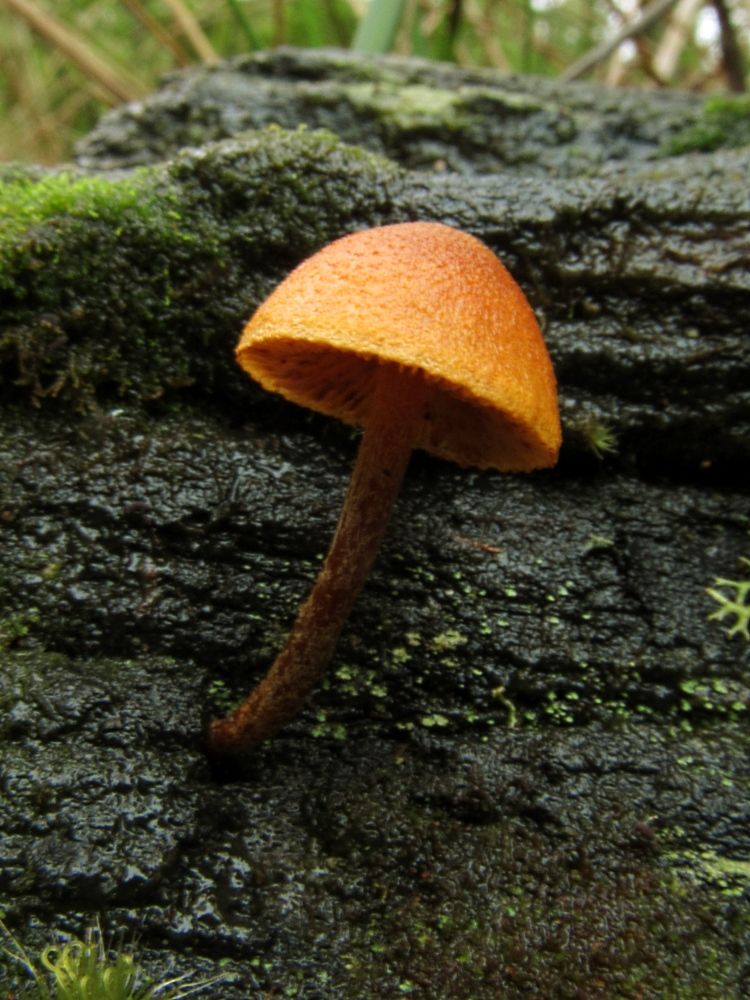
- Gymnopilus ferruginosus in Silverband Falls, Grampians National Park, Victoria, Australia

Scientific classification
- Kingdom: Fungi
- Division: Basidiomycota
- Class: Agaricomycetes
- Order: Agaricales
- Family: Hymenogastraceae
- Genus: Gymnopilus
- Species: G. ferruginosus

Binomial name
- Gymnopilus ferruginosus B.J. Rees

= Gymnopilus ferruginosus =

Species of mushroom

Gymnopilus ferruginosus Mycological characteristics
- Gills on hymenium
- Cap is convex
- Hymenium is adnexed or adnate
- Ecology is saprotrophic

Gymnopilus ferruginosus is a species of mushroom in the family Hymenogastraceae.

== See also ==
List of Gymnopilus species
