= Gymnopilus austropicreus =

Scientific classification
- Kingdom: Fungi
- Division: Basidiomycota
- Class: Agaricomycetes
- Order: Agaricales
- Family: Hymenogastraceae
- Genus: Gymnopilus
- Species: G. austropicreus

Binomial name
- Gymnopilus austropicreus B.J.Rees (2001)

Species of fungus

Gymnopilus austropicreus Mycological characteristics
- Gills on hymenium
- Cap is convex
- Hymenium is adnexed or adnate
- Ecology is saprotrophic

Gymnopilus austropicreus is a species of mushroom-forming fungus in the family Hymenogastraceae. It is found in Australia.

== See also ==
- List of Gymnopilus species
