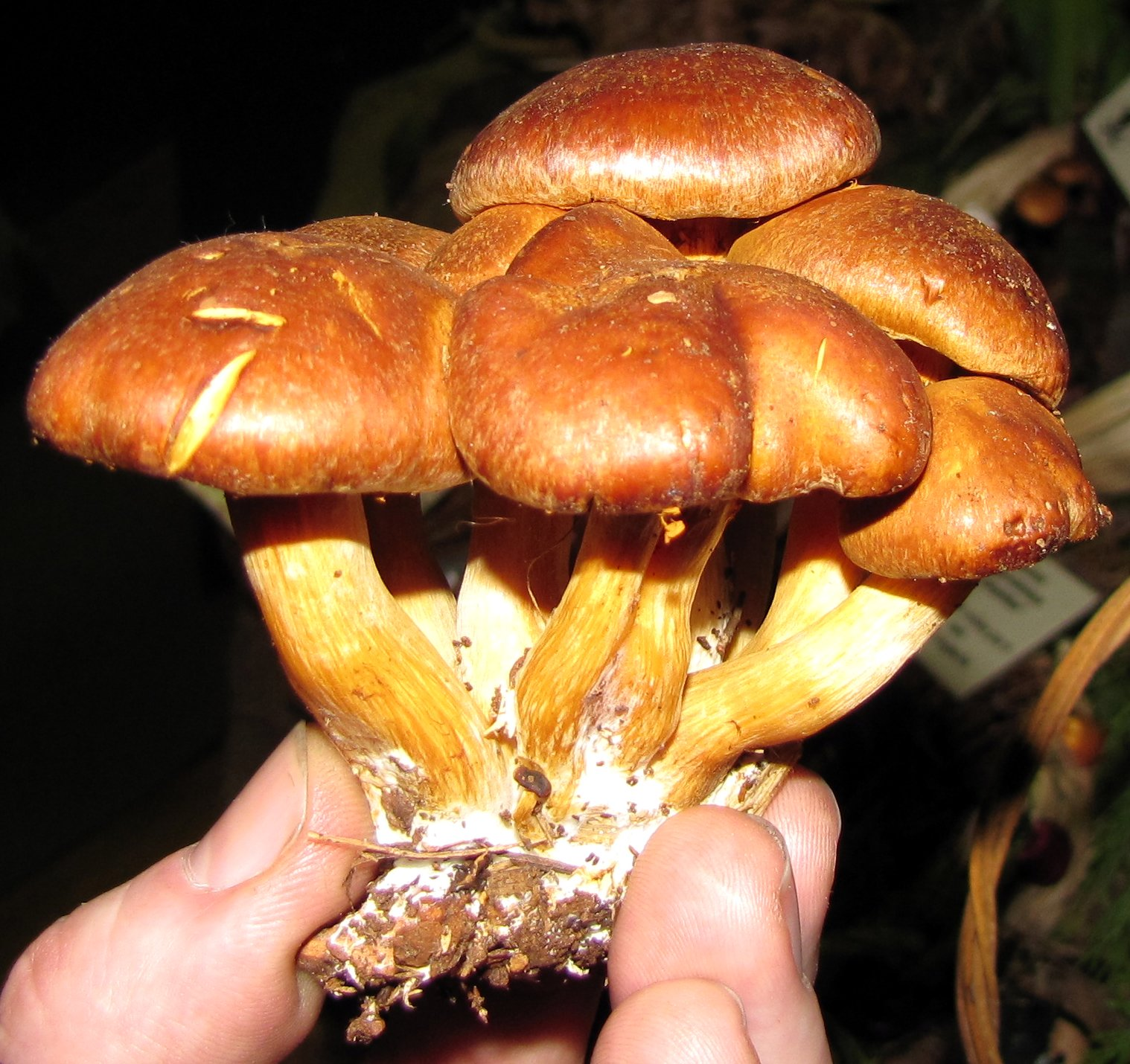

Scientific classification
- Kingdom: Fungi
- Division: Basidiomycota
- Class: Agaricomycetes
- Order: Agaricales
- Family: Hymenogastraceae
- Genus: Gymnopilus
- Species: G. flavidellus

Binomial name
- Gymnopilus flavidellus Murrill

= Gymnopilus flavidellus =

Species of fungus

Gymnopilus flavidellus Mycological characteristics
- Gills on hymenium
- Cap is convex
- Hymenium is adnexed or adnate
- Ecology is saprotrophic

Gymnopilus flavidellus is a species of mushroom in the family Hymenogastraceae.

== Description ==
The cap is 2 to 5 centimetres (0.8 to 2.0 in) in diameter.

== Habitat and distribution ==
Gymnopilus flavidellus grows on coniferous and deciduous wood, such as stumps, buried wood, fallen limbs, and sawdust. It can be found in most of temperate North America, fruiting from autumn to winter.

== See also ==
List of Gymnopilus species
