= Gymnopilus noviholocirrhus =

Scientific classification
- Kingdom: Fungi
- Division: Basidiomycota
- Class: Agaricomycetes
- Order: Agaricales
- Family: Hymenogastraceae
- Genus: Gymnopilus
- Species: G. noviholocirrhus

Binomial name
- Gymnopilus noviholocirrhus S. Ito & S. Imai

Species of fungus

Gymnopilus noviholocirrhus Mycological characteristics
- Gills on hymenium
- Cap is convex
- Hymenium is adnexed or adnate
- Ecology is saprotrophic

Gymnopilus noviholocirrhus is a species of mushroom in the family Hymenogastraceae. This species is known only from one locality, on the island of Hahajima, growing on the species Celtis boninensis. It is thought to be extinct.

== See also ==
- List of Gymnopilus species
