= Gymnopilus aurantiobrunneus =

Scientific classification
- Kingdom: Fungi
- Division: Basidiomycota
- Class: Agaricomycetes
- Order: Agaricales
- Family: Hymenogastraceae
- Genus: Gymnopilus
- Species: G. aurantiobrunneus

Binomial name
- Gymnopilus aurantiobrunneus Z.S.Bi (1986)

Species of fungus

Gymnopilus aurantiobrunneus
- Mycological characteristics
- Gills on hymenium
- Cap is convex
- Hymenium is adnexed or adnate
- Ecology is saprotrophic

Gymnopilus aurantiobrunneus is a species of mushroom-forming fungus in the family Hymenogastraceae. It is found on rotten trees in southern China. The pileus is 1.8–5 cm wide and yellowish to brownish.

== See also ==
- List of Gymnopilus species
