= Gymnopilus janthinosarx =

Scientific classification
- Kingdom: Fungi
- Division: Basidiomycota
- Class: Agaricomycetes
- Order: Agaricales
- Family: Hymenogastraceae
- Genus: Gymnopilus
- Species: G. janthinosarx

Binomial name
- Gymnopilus janthinosarx (Singer) Singer

Species of fungus

Gymnopilus janthinosarx Mycological characteristics
- Gills on hymenium
- Cap is convex
- Hymenium is adnexed or adnate
- Ecology is saprotrophic

Gymnopilus janthinosarx is a species of mushroom in the family Hymenogastraceae. It was given its current name by mycologist Rolf Singer in 1951.

== See also ==
List of Gymnopilus species
