= Gymnopilus lutescens =

Scientific classification
- Kingdom: Fungi
- Division: Basidiomycota
- Class: Agaricomycetes
- Order: Agaricales
- Family: Hymenogastraceae
- Genus: Gymnopilus
- Species: G. lutescens

Binomial name
- Gymnopilus lutescens Hesler (1969)

Species of fungus

Gymnopilus lutescens
- Mycological characteristics
- Gills on hymenium
- Cap is convex
- Hymenium is adnexed or adnate
- Ecology is saprotrophic

Gymnopilus lutescens is a species of mushroom-forming fungus in the family Hymenogastraceae.

== Description ==
The cap is 4 to 6 centimetres (1.6 to 2.4 in) in diameter.

== Habitat and distribution ==
Gymnopilus lutescens grows on hardwood. It has been collected in Michigan, in July.

== See also ==
- List of Gymnopilus species
