= Gymnopilus pachycystis =

Scientific classification
- Kingdom: Fungi
- Division: Basidiomycota
- Class: Agaricomycetes
- Order: Agaricales
- Family: Hymenogastraceae
- Genus: Gymnopilus
- Species: G. pachycystis

Binomial name
- Gymnopilus pachycystis Singer (1989)

Species of fungus

Gymnopilus pachycystis is a species of mushroom-forming fungus in the family Hymenogastraceae. It is found in Central America.

== See also ==
- List of Gymnopilus species
