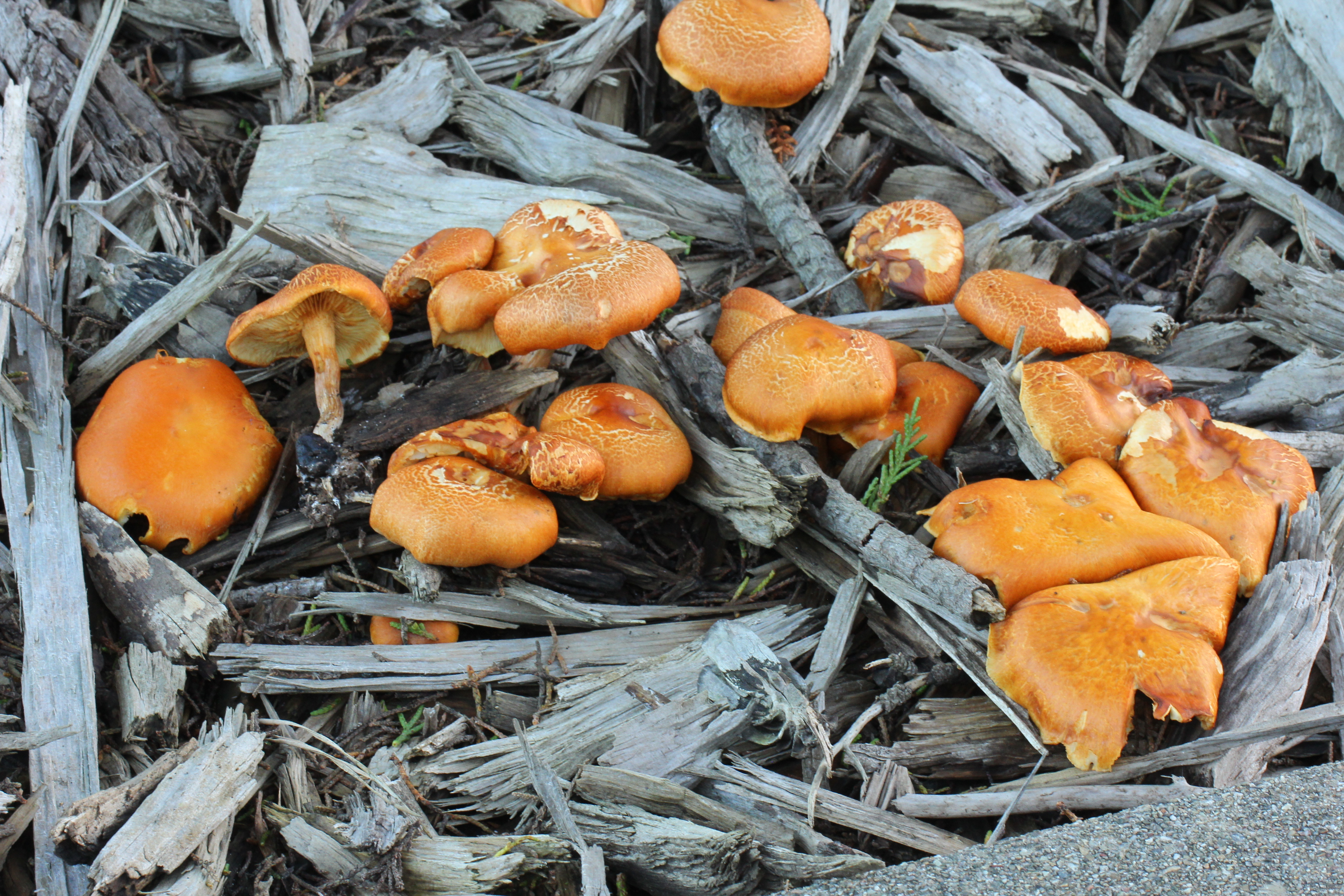

Scientific classification
- Domain: Eukaryota
- Kingdom: Fungi
- Division: Basidiomycota
- Class: Agaricomycetes
- Order: Agaricales
- Family: Hymenogastraceae
- Genus: Gymnopilus
- Species: G. echinulisporus

Binomial name
- Gymnopilus echinulisporus Murrill (1912)

= Gymnopilus echinulisporus =

Species of fungus

Gymnopilus echinulisporus Mycological characteristics
- Gills on hymenium
- Cap is convex
- Hymenium is adnexed or adnate
- Ecology is saprotrophic
- Edibility is inedible

Gymnopilus echinulisporus is a species of agaric fungus in the family Hymenogastraceae. It was first formally described by American mycologist William Alphonso Murrill in 1912.

== Description ==
The convex to flattened cap is up to 7 cm (2.8 in) in diameter.

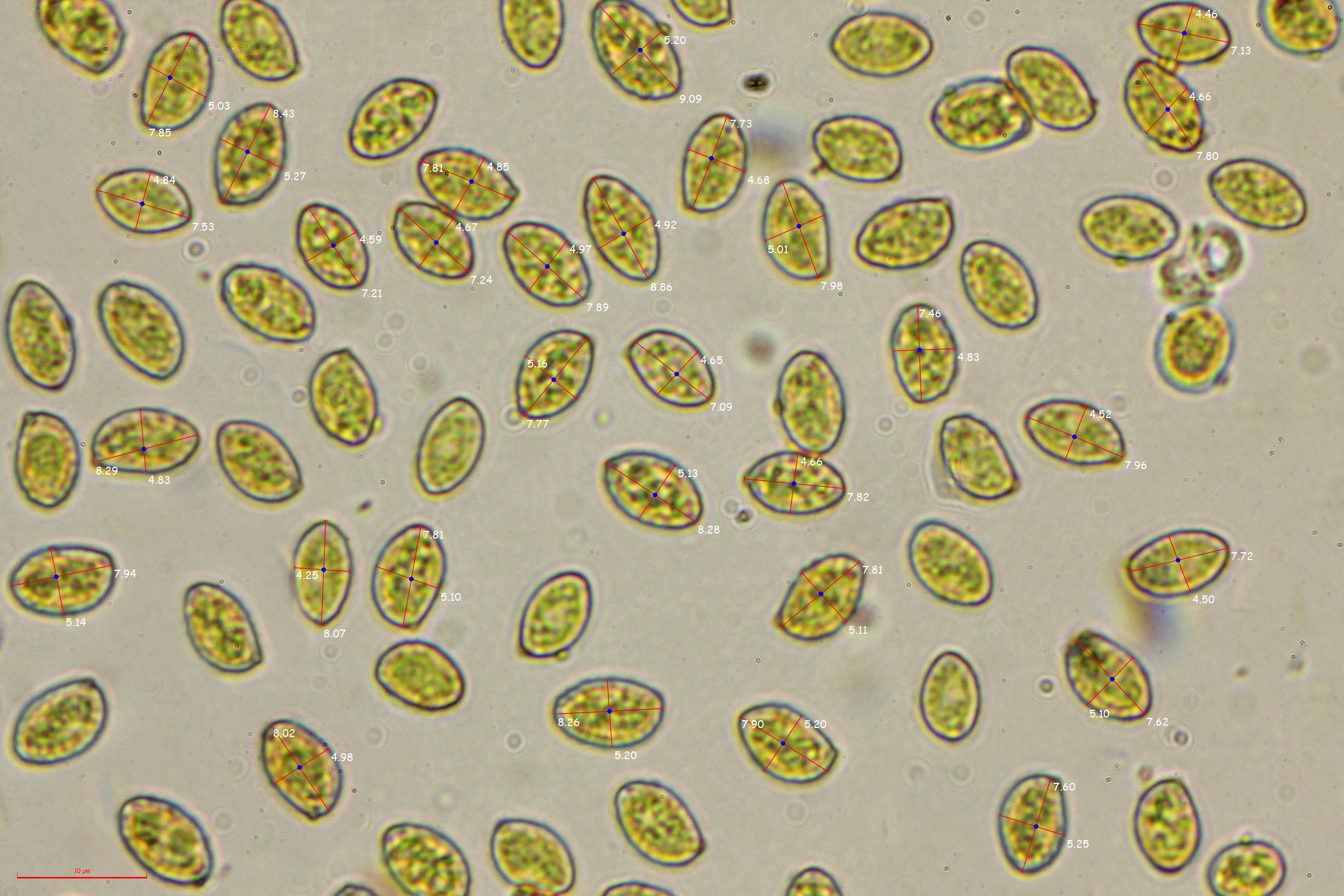
Spores of G. echinulisporus at 1000x magnification

== Habitat and distribution ==
Gymnopilus echinulisporus has been found growing on wood in Oregon in November.

== See also ==
- List of Gymnopilus species
