= Gymnopilus communis =

Scientific classification
- Kingdom: Fungi
- Division: Basidiomycota
- Class: Agaricomycetes
- Order: Agaricales
- Family: Hymenogastraceae
- Genus: Gymnopilus
- Species: G. communis

Binomial name
- Gymnopilus communis Guzm.-Dáv. (1994)

Species of fungus

Gymnopilus communis is a species of agaric fungus in the family Hymenogastraceae. Found in Veracruz, Mexico, it was described as new to science in 1994.

== Taxonomy ==
The type collection of Gymnopilus communis was discovered fruiting on wood in a pine-oak forest in Veracruz, Mexico in July 1992. Mycologist Laura Guzmán Dávalos described it and five other novel Mexican Gymnopilus species in the journal Mycotaxon in 1994. The specific epithet communis refers to its common habit.

== Description ==
The bell-shaped to convex cap is about 3 cm (1.2 in) in diameter, and has a broad umbo. It is brownish orange with a smooth to finely fibrillose surface texture. The narrow gills are closely spaced, and orange-yellow with a yellowish edge. The stipe, roughly the same color as the cap or lighter, measures 5.8 cm (2.3 in) long by 5–6 mm (0.20–0.24 in) wide.

The spores are ellipsoid, with surfaces covered in small warts, and measure 6–8.4 by 4–4.8 μm. The basidia (spore-bearing cells) are club-shaped and measure 24.8 by 7.2 μm. They are four-spored, with sterigmata up to 3.2 μm long.

Similar species include Gymnopilus longipes, G. liquiritiae, and G. subsapineus.

== Habitat and distribution ==
Gymnopilus communis is known only from the type locality in Veracruz.

== See also ==
List of Gymnopilus species
