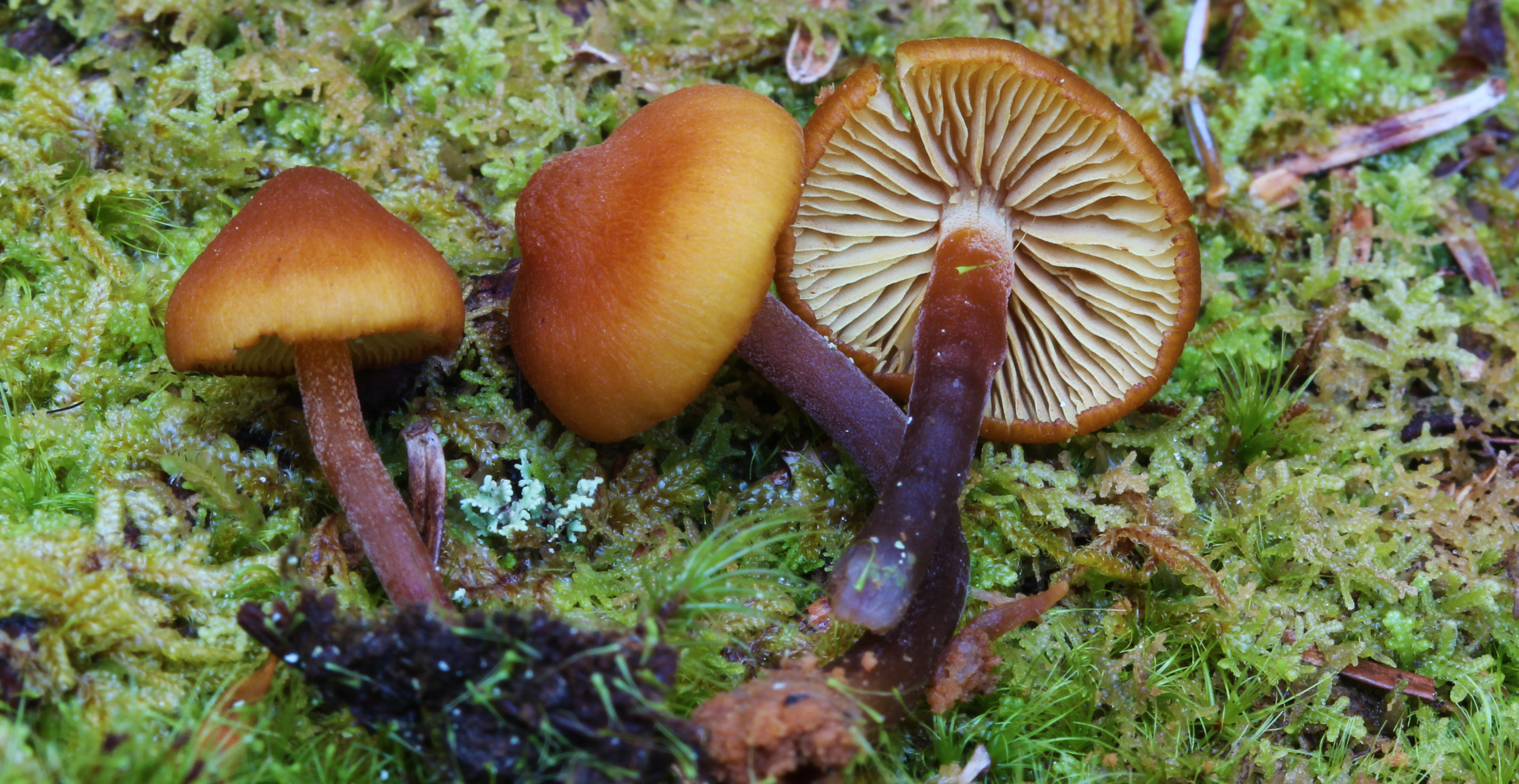
- Gymnopilus bellulus in Mount Mitchell, Blue Ridge Mountains, North Carolina, US

Scientific classification
- Domain: Eukaryota
- Kingdom: Fungi
- Division: Basidiomycota
- Class: Agaricomycetes
- Order: Agaricales
- Family: Hymenogastraceae
- Genus: Gymnopilus
- Species: G. bellulus

Binomial name
- Gymnopilus bellulus (Peck) Murrill

= Gymnopilus bellulus =

Species of mushroom

Gymnopilus bellulus Mycological characteristics
- Gills on hymenium
- Cap is convex
- Hymenium is adnexed or adnate
- Ecology is saprotrophic

Gymnopilus bellulus is a species of mushroom in the family Hymenogastraceae. It was given its current name by American mycologist Murrill in 1917. It is odorless, bitter in taste, and regarded as inedible.

== Description ==
The cap is 1 to 2.5 centimetres (3/8 to 1 in) in diameter, and yellow to brown in color. The gills are yellow and turn brownish with age. The stipe is red-brown.

== Habitat and distribution ==
Gymnopilus bellulus has been found on conifer stumps and logs in the Northern United States, Tennessee, and Canada from June to January. It also occurs in Europe.

== See also ==
List of Gymnopilus species
