= Gymnopilus viscidus =

Scientific classification
- Domain: Eukaryota
- Kingdom: Fungi
- Division: Basidiomycota
- Class: Agaricomycetes
- Order: Agaricales
- Family: Hymenogastraceae
- Genus: Gymnopilus
- Species: G. viscidus

Binomial name
- Gymnopilus viscidus (Peck) Murrill

Species of fungus

Gymnopilus viscidus Mycological characteristics
- Gills on hymenium
- Cap is convex
- Hymenium is adnexed or adnate
- Ecology is saprotrophic

Gymnopilus viscidus is a species of mushroom in the family Hymenogastraceae. It was given its current name by American mycologist Murrill in 1917.

== See also ==
- List of Gymnopilus species
