= Gymnopilus pulchrifolius =

Scientific classification
- Kingdom: Fungi
- Division: Basidiomycota
- Class: Agaricomycetes
- Order: Agaricales
- Family: Hymenogastraceae
- Genus: Gymnopilus
- Species: G. pulchrifolius

Binomial name
- Gymnopilus pulchrifolius (Peck) Murrill

Species of fungus

Gymnopilus pulchrifolius
- Mycological characteristics
- Gills on hymenium
- Cap is convex
- Hymenium is adnexed or adnate
- Ecology is saprotrophic

Gymnopilus pulchrifolius is a species of mushroom in the family Hymenogastraceae. It was given its current name by American mycologist Murrill in 1917.

== Description ==
The cap is 2.5 to 5 centimetres (1.0 to 2.0 in) in diameter.

== Habitat and distribution ==
Gymnopilus pulchrifolius grows on decaying hemlock wood. It has been found in the US states of New York, Massachusetts, Minnesota, and Indiana; fruiting between July and September.

== See also ==
- List of Gymnopilus species
