= Gymnopilus parvulus =

Scientific classification
- Kingdom: Fungi
- Division: Basidiomycota
- Class: Agaricomycetes
- Order: Agaricales
- Family: Hymenogastraceae
- Genus: Gymnopilus
- Species: G. parvulus

Binomial name
- Gymnopilus parvulus Murrill

Species of fungus

Gymnopilus parvulus Mycological characteristics
- Gills on hymenium
- Cap is convex
- Hymenium is adnexed or adnate
- Ecology is saprotrophic

Gymnopilus parvulus is a species of mushroom in the family Hymenogastraceae.

== Description ==
The cap is 2 to 4 centimetres (0.8 to 1.6 in) in diameter.

== Habitat and distribution ==
Gymnopilus parvulus grows on logs. It has been found in Jamaica between October and January.

== See also ==
- List of Gymnopilus species
