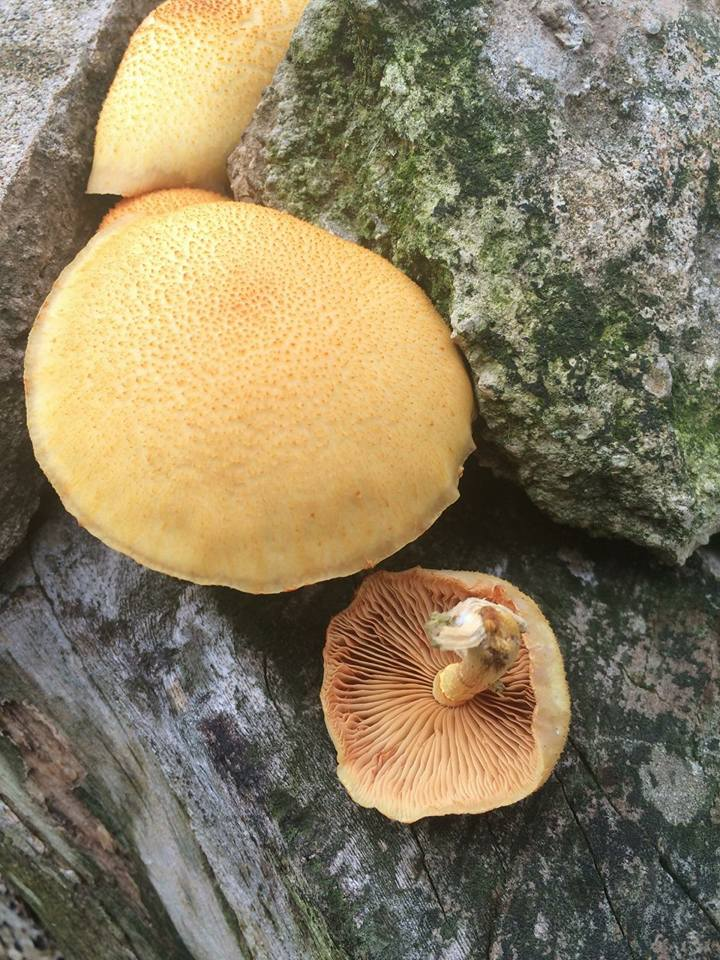
- Gymnopilus chrysopellus in San Juan, Puerto Rico, US

Scientific classification
- Kingdom: Fungi
- Division: Basidiomycota
- Class: Agaricomycetes
- Order: Agaricales
- Family: Hymenogastraceae
- Genus: Gymnopilus
- Species: G. chrysopellus

Binomial name
- Gymnopilus chrysopellus (Berk. & M.A. Curtis) Murrill

= Gymnopilus chrysopellus =

Species of mushroom

Gymnopilus chrysopellus Mycological characteristics
- Gills on hymenium
- Cap is convex
- Hymenium is adnexed or adnate
- Ecology is saprotrophic

Gymnopilus chrysopellus is a species of mushroom in the family Hymenogastraceae.

== Description ==
The cap is 2.5 to 4 centimetres (1.0 to 1.6 in) in diameter.

== Habitat and distribution ==
Gymnopilus chrysopellus has been found growing on dead wood in Cuba.

== See also ==
List of Gymnopilus species
