= Gymnopilus galerinopsis =

Scientific classification
- Kingdom: Fungi
- Division: Basidiomycota
- Class: Agaricomycetes
- Order: Agaricales
- Family: Hymenogastraceae
- Genus: Gymnopilus
- Species: G. galerinopsis

Binomial name
- Gymnopilus galerinopsis Guzm.-Dáv.

Species of fungus

Gymnopilus galerinopsis Mycological characteristics
- Gills on hymenium
- Cap is convex
- Hymenium is adnexed or adnate
- Ecology is saprotrophic

Gymnopilus galerinopsis is a species of mushroom in the family Hymenogastraceae. It is found in the state of Veracruz, Mexico.

== See also ==
List of Gymnopilus species
