= Gymnopilus nevadensis =

Scientific classification
- Domain: Eukaryota
- Kingdom: Fungi
- Division: Basidiomycota
- Class: Agaricomycetes
- Order: Agaricales
- Family: Hymenogastraceae
- Genus: Gymnopilus
- Species: G. nevadensis

Binomial name
- Gymnopilus nevadensis Guzm.-Dáv. & Guzmán (1991)

Species of fungus

Gymnopilus nevadensis is a species of mushroom in the family Hymenogastraceae. The fungus was described as new to science in 1991 by Gastón Guzmán and his daughter Laura Guzmán Dávalos. The type collection was found in Jalisco, Mexico, where it was fruiting in a cluster on a dead branch in a pine and oak woodland.

This species is in the nevadensis-penetrans infrageneric grouping of the genus Gymnopilus.

== See also ==
- List of Gymnopilus species
