= Gymnopilus hispidellus =

Scientific classification
- Kingdom: Fungi
- Division: Basidiomycota
- Class: Agaricomycetes
- Order: Agaricales
- Family: Hymenogastraceae
- Genus: Gymnopilus
- Species: G. hispidellus

Binomial name
- Gymnopilus hispidellus Murrill

Species of fungus

Gymnopilus hispidellus
- Mycological characteristics
- Gills on hymenium
- Cap is convex
- Hymenium is adnexed or adnate
- Ecology is saprotrophic

Gymnopilus hispidellus is a species of mushroom in the family Hymenogastraceae.

== Description ==
The cap is 2 to 4 centimetres (0.8 to 1.6 in) in diameter.

== Habitat and distribution ==
This species has been found growing scattered or subcespitose (with stems clumped together), on logs, in Cuba in March.

== Phylogeny ==
Gymnopilus hispidellus is in the aeruginosus-luteofolius infrageneric grouping.

== See also ==
List of Gymnopilus species
