= Gymnopilus fulvicolor =

Scientific classification
- Kingdom: Fungi
- Division: Basidiomycota
- Class: Agaricomycetes
- Order: Agaricales
- Family: Hymenogastraceae
- Genus: Gymnopilus
- Species: G. fulvicolor

Binomial name
- Gymnopilus fulvicolor Murrill

Species of fungus

Gymnopilus fulvicolor Mycological characteristics
- Gills on hymenium
- Cap is convex
- Hymenium is adnexed or adnate
- Ecology is saprotrophic

Gymnopilus fulvicolor is a species of mushroom in the family Hymenogastraceae.

== Description ==
The cap is 5 centimetres (2.0 in) in diameter.

== Habitat and distribution ==
Gymnopilus fulvicolor grows on leaf-mold, among sticks, under pine trees. In North America, it has been collected in Florida, in January.

== See also ==
List of Gymnopilus species
