= Gymnopilus earlei =

Scientific classification
- Kingdom: Fungi
- Division: Basidiomycota
- Class: Agaricomycetes
- Order: Agaricales
- Family: Hymenogastraceae
- Genus: Gymnopilus
- Species: G. earlei

Binomial name
- Gymnopilus earlei Murrill

Species of fungus

Gymnopilus earlei Mycological characteristics
- Gills on hymenium
- Cap is convex
- Hymenium is adnexed or adnate
- Ecology is saprotrophic

Gymnopilus earlei is a species of mushroom in the family Hymenogastraceae.

== Description ==
The cap is 3 to 10 centimetres (1.2 to 3.9 in) in diameter.

== Habitat and distribution ==
Gymnopilus earlei has been found on coconut logs in Jamaica, during October to November.

== See also ==
List of Gymnopilus species
