= Gymnopilus praefloccosus =

Scientific classification
- Kingdom: Fungi
- Division: Basidiomycota
- Class: Agaricomycetes
- Order: Agaricales
- Family: Hymenogastraceae
- Genus: Gymnopilus
- Species: G. praefloccosus

Binomial name
- Gymnopilus praefloccosus Murrill

Species of fungus

Gymnopilus praefloccosus Mycological characteristics
- Gills on hymenium
- Cap is convex
- Hymenium is adnexed or adnate
- Ecology is saprotrophic

Gymnopilus praefloccosus is a species of mushroom in the family Hymenogastraceae.

== Description ==
The cap is 2 to 3 centimetres (0.8 to 1.2 in) in diameter.

== Habitat and distribution ==
Gymnopilus praefloccosus grows on decayed sweetgum logs. It has been found in Florida, in May.

== See also ==
- List of Gymnopilus species
