= Gymnopilus pholiotoides =

Scientific classification
- Kingdom: Fungi
- Division: Basidiomycota
- Class: Agaricomycetes
- Order: Agaricales
- Family: Hymenogastraceae
- Genus: Gymnopilus
- Species: G. pholiotoides

Binomial name
- Gymnopilus pholiotoides Murrill

Species of fungus

Gymnopilus pholiotoides Mycological characteristics
- Gills on hymenium
- Cap is convex
- Hymenium is adnexed or adnate
- Ecology is saprotrophic

Gymnopilus pholiotoides is a species of mushroom in the family Hymenogastraceae.

== Description ==
The cap is 3 centimetres (1.2 in) in diameter.

== Habitat and distribution ==
Gymnopilus pholiotoides grows on palm trunks in Cuba; fruit bodies have been found in May.

== See also ==
- List of Gymnopilus species
