= Gymnopilus weberi =

Scientific classification
- Kingdom: Fungi
- Division: Basidiomycota
- Class: Agaricomycetes
- Order: Agaricales
- Family: Hymenogastraceae
- Genus: Gymnopilus
- Species: G. weberi

Binomial name
- Gymnopilus weberi Murrill (1946)

Synonyms
- Flammula weberi (Murrill) Murrill (1946)

Species of fungus

Gymnopilus weberi is a species of mushroom in the family Hymenogastraceae. Found in North America, it was described as new to science in 1946 by mycologist William Alphonso Murrill.

== See also ==
- List of Gymnopilus species
