= Gymnopilus magnificus =

Scientific classification
- Kingdom: Fungi
- Division: Basidiomycota
- Class: Agaricomycetes
- Order: Agaricales
- Family: Hymenogastraceae
- Genus: Gymnopilus
- Species: G. magnificus

Binomial name
- Gymnopilus magnificus Guzm.-Dáv. & Guzmán (1986)

Species of fungus

Gymnopilus magnificus Mycological characteristics
- Gills on hymenium
- Cap is convex
- Hymenium is adnexed or adnate
- Ecology is saprotrophic

Gymnopilus magnificus is a species of mushroom in the family Hymenogastraceae. It was described as new to science in 1986 by Mexican mycologists Gastón Guzmán and Laura Guzmán Dávalos.

== See also ==
- List of Gymnopilus species
