= Gymnopilus areolatus =

Scientific classification
- Domain: Eukaryota
- Kingdom: Fungi
- Division: Basidiomycota
- Class: Agaricomycetes
- Order: Agaricales
- Family: Hymenogastraceae
- Genus: Gymnopilus
- Species: G. areolatus

Binomial name
- Gymnopilus areolatus Murrill (1913)

Synonyms
- Flammula areolata (Murrill) Murrill (1913)

Species of fungus

Gymnopilus areolatus Mycological characteristics
- Gills on hymenium
- Cap is convex
- Hymenium is adnexed or adnate
- Ecology is saprotrophic

Gymnopilus areolatus is a species of mushroom-forming fungus in the family Hymenogastraceae. It was first formally described by American mycologist William Alphonso Murrill, from specimens collected in Cuba.

== Description ==
The cap is 3 to 7 centimetres (1.2 to 2.8 in) in diameter.

== Habitat and distribution ==
Gymnopilus areolatus typically grows clumped together on stumps, and logs of hardwoods and palms. It is found in Cuba in May and September.

== See also ==
- List of Gymnopilus species
