= Gymnopilus aureobrunneus =

Scientific classification
- Domain: Eukaryota
- Kingdom: Fungi
- Division: Basidiomycota
- Class: Agaricomycetes
- Order: Agaricales
- Family: Hymenogastraceae
- Genus: Gymnopilus
- Species: G. aureobrunneus

Binomial name
- Gymnopilus aureobrunneus (Berk. & M.A. Curtis) Murrill

Species of fungus

Gymnopilus aureobrunneus Mycological characteristics
- Gills on hymenium
- Cap is convex
- Hymenium is adnexed or adnate
- Ecology is saprotrophic

Gymnopilus aureobrunneus is a species of mushroom in the family Hymenogastraceae.

== Description ==
The cap is 2 to 5 centimetres (0.8 to 2.0 in) in diameter.

== Habitat and distribution ==
Gymnopilus aureobrunneus grows on logs and stumps in Cuba.

== See also ==
- List of Gymnopilus species
