= Gymnopilus chrysotrichoides =

Scientific classification
- Kingdom: Fungi
- Division: Basidiomycota
- Class: Agaricomycetes
- Order: Agaricales
- Family: Hymenogastraceae
- Genus: Gymnopilus
- Species: G. chrysotrichoides

Binomial name
- Gymnopilus chrysotrichoides Murrill

Species of fungus

Gymnopilus chrysotrichoides Mycological characteristics
- Gills on hymenium
- Cap is convex
- Hymenium is adnexed or adnate
- Ecology is saprotrophic

Gymnopilus chrysotrichoides is a species of mushroom in the family Hymenogastraceae.

== Description ==
The cap is 7 centimetres (2.8 in) in diameter.

== Habitat and distribution ==
Gymnopilus chrysotrichoides has been found growing on coconut logs, in Cuba in October.

== See also ==
List of Gymnopilus species
