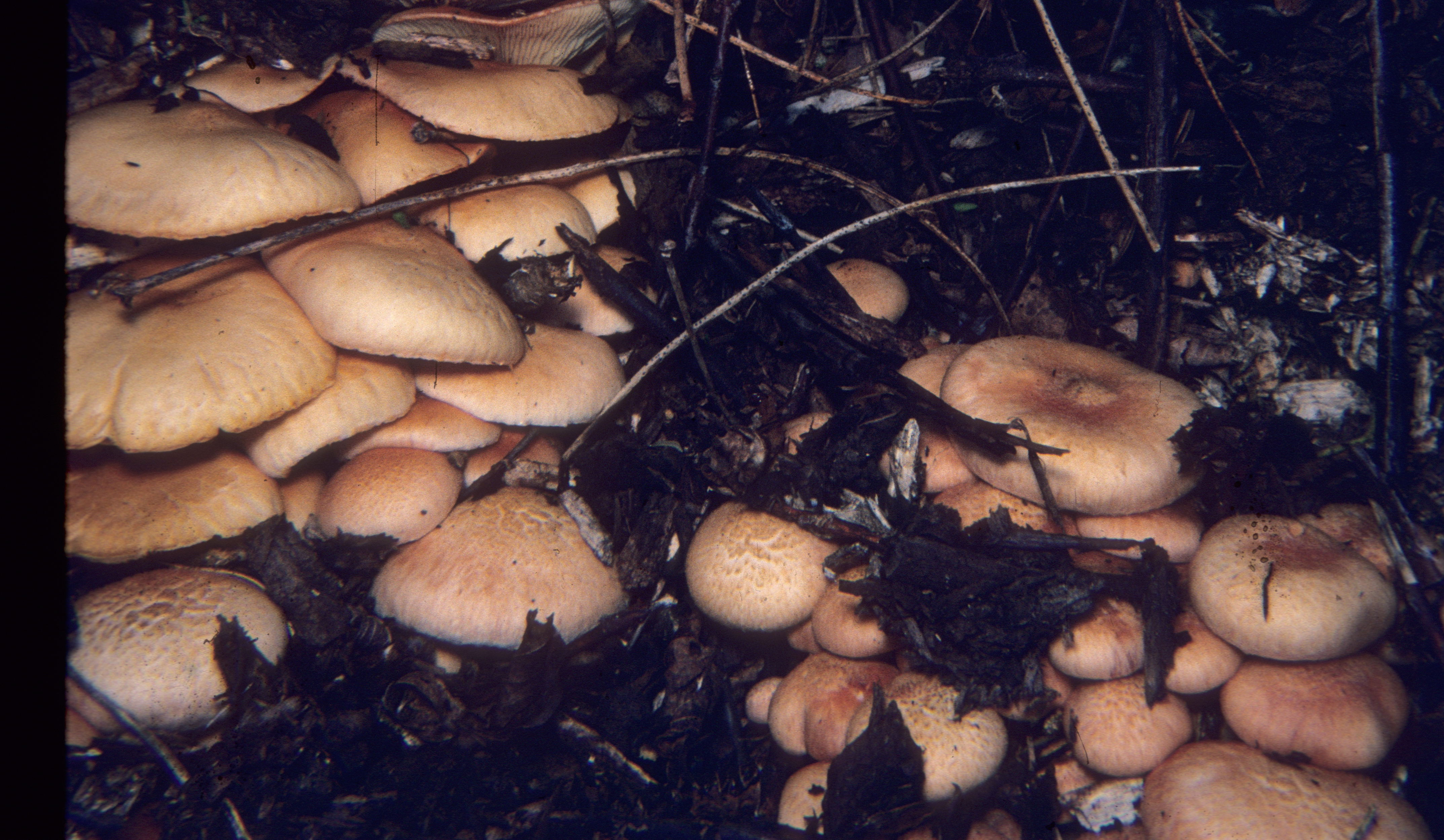
- Gymnopilus aeruginosus growing from a pile of wood mulch

Scientific classification
- Kingdom: Fungi
- Division: Basidiomycota
- Class: Agaricomycetes
- Order: Agaricales
- Family: Hymenogastraceae
- Genus: Gymnopilus
- Species: G. aeruginosus

Binomial name
- Gymnopilus aeruginosus (Peck) Singer (1951)

Synonyms
- Pholiota aeruginosa Peck (1890)

= Gymnopilus aeruginosus =

Species of psychoactive fungus

Gymnopilus aeruginosus
- Mycological characteristics
- Gills on hymenium
- Cap is convex
- Hymenium is adnexed or adnate
- Stipe has a ring
- Spore print is yellow-orange
- Ecology is saprotrophic
- Edibility is psychoactive

Gymnopilus aeruginosus, also known as the magic blue gym, is a mushroom-forming fungus. It has a rusty orange spore print and a bitter taste. Growing in clusters on dead wood, it is widely distributed and common in the Pacific Northwest. It contains the psychedelic chemical psilocybin.

== Taxonomy ==
The species was given its current name by mycologist Rolf Singer in 1951.

The specific epithet aeruginosus refers to the bluish staining caused by psilocin polymerization.

== Description ==
The cap is 5–15 centimetres (2–6 in) across, convex with an incurved margin and expands to broadly convex to almost plane in age. The top is dry, fibrillose, and scaly, often with a blueish-green tinge when young. The color is variable, often with various bluish-green, pink, or vinaceous patches. The cap is sometimes cracked in age. The flesh is pallid to whitish, sometimes turning buff or pinkish-buff in age. The scales are tawny or reddish becoming dark brown.

The gills are close or crowded, and broad. They are buff to yellow-orange or ochre, and adnexed to adnate. They are at first slightly decurrent, often seceding. The edges are even to slightly rough. The spore print is rusty to rusty-orange or rusty-cinnamon.

The stipe is 5–12 cm long and 1–1.5 cm thick, its width generally equal. It is covered with appressed fibrils, soon disappearing. It is smooth, dry, dusted with rusty orange spores and has a cottony, scanty, yellowish, partially fibrillose veil that leaves an evanescent zone of hairs near the apex of the stipe. It is colored much like the cap; it is flesh whitish, tinged greenish or bluish-green, becoming yellowish or pinkish-brown when dry. It is solid but becomes hollow and is sometimes striated.

The spores are 6–9 μm by 3.5–4.5 μm and have no germ pore. They are roughened and elliptical. Pleurocystidia are rare and clamp connections are present. The basidia each have four spores.

=== Similar species ===
Gymnopilus harmoge is a possible synonym and G. punctifolius is a similar color, but with a bald cap and no veil.

== Habitat and formation ==
Gymnopilus aeruginosus grows gregariously to cespitosely on stumps, logs, and woodchip mulch/sawdust on hardwood and conifers. It grows in spring, fall, and winter, and is common in the Pacific Northwest. It also grows in some of the southern states of the United States, such as Tennessee, and Georgia. It is also found in Japan and Korea.

== Psychoactivity ==
The species is psychoactive, apparently containing the hallucinogenic drugs psilocybin and psilocin.

== See also ==
- List of Gymnopilus species
