= Gymnopilus bryophilus =

Scientific classification
- Domain: Eukaryota
- Kingdom: Fungi
- Division: Basidiomycota
- Class: Agaricomycetes
- Order: Agaricales
- Family: Hymenogastraceae
- Genus: Gymnopilus
- Species: G. bryophilus

Binomial name
- Gymnopilus bryophilus Murrill

Species of fungus

Gymnopilus bryophilus Mycological characteristics
- Gills on hymenium
- Cap is convex
- Hymenium is adnexed or adnate
- Ecology is saprotrophic

Gymnopilus bryophilus is a species of mushroom in the family Hymenogastraceae.

== Description ==
The cap is 2 to 5 centimetres (0.8 to 2.0 in) in diameter.

== Habitat and distribution ==
Gymnopilus bryophilus has been found growing on decayed mossy logs, in Jamaica in November.

== See also ==
List of Gymnopilus species
