= Gymnopilus acystidiatus =

Scientific classification
- Kingdom: Fungi
- Division: Basidiomycota
- Class: Agaricomycetes
- Order: Agaricales
- Family: Hymenogastraceae
- Genus: Gymnopilus
- Species: G. acystidiatus

Binomial name
- Gymnopilus acystidiatus Guzm.-Dáv. & Guzmán (1991)

Species of fungus

Gymnopilus acystidiatus is a species of mushroom-forming fungus in the family Hymenogastraceae. It is found in Jalisco, Mexico, where it grows in pine and oak woodland. The fungus was described as new to science in 1991 by Gastón Guzmán and his daughter Laura Guzmán-Dávalos.

== See also ==
- List of Gymnopilus species
