= Gymnopilus nashii =

Scientific classification
- Kingdom: Fungi
- Division: Basidiomycota
- Class: Agaricomycetes
- Order: Agaricales
- Family: Hymenogastraceae
- Genus: Gymnopilus
- Species: G. nashii

Binomial name
- Gymnopilus nashii Murrill

Synonyms
- Flammula nashii (Murrill) Murrill

Species of fungus

Gymnopilus nashii
- Mycological characteristics
- Gills on hymenium
- Cap is convex
- Hymenium is adnexed or adnate
- Ecology is saprotrophic

Gymnopilus nashii is a species of mushroom-forming fungus in the family Hymenogastraceae.

== See also ==
- List of Gymnopilus species
