= Gymnopilus armillatus =

Scientific classification
- Kingdom: Fungi
- Division: Basidiomycota
- Class: Agaricomycetes
- Order: Agaricales
- Family: Hymenogastraceae
- Genus: Gymnopilus
- Species: G. armillatus

Binomial name
- Gymnopilus armillatus Murrill (1940)

Species of fungus

Gymnopilus armillatus Mycological characteristics
- Gills on hymenium
- Cap is convex
- Hymenium is adnexed or adnate
- Ecology is saprotrophic

Gymnopilus armillatus is a species of mushroom-forming fungus in the family Hymenogastraceae.

== Description ==
The cap is 5 to 10 centimetres (2.0 to 3.9 in) in diameter.

== Habitat and distribution ==
Gymnopilus armillatus has been found growing on the root of a living sweetgum tree, in Florida in December.

== See also ==
- List of Gymnopilus species
