= Gymnopilus oregonensis =

Scientific classification
- Kingdom: Fungi
- Division: Basidiomycota
- Class: Agaricomycetes
- Order: Agaricales
- Family: Hymenogastraceae
- Genus: Gymnopilus
- Species: G. oregonensis

Binomial name
- Gymnopilus oregonensis Murrill

Species of fungus

Gymnopilus oregonensis
- Mycological characteristics
- Gills on hymenium
- Cap is convex
- Hymenium is adnexed or adnate
- Lacks a stipe
- Spore print is brown
- Ecology is saprotrophic
- Edibility is unknown

Gymnopilus oregonensis is a species of mushroom in the family Hymenogastraceae.

== Description ==
The cap of Gymnopilus oregonensis is 1.5 to 2.5 centimetres (0.6 to 1.0 in) in diameter. It can be convex or round, and is brownish in color. The stipe is 3–8 centimetres (1.2–3.1 in) long and 2-7 millimetres wide. The gills start out yellowish, before becoming brownish in age. The spore print is orangish brown.

== Habitat and distribution ==
Gymnopilus oregonensis has been found growing on conifer logs in Oregon, in November. It fruits in late summer and autumn.

== See also ==
- List of Gymnopilus species
