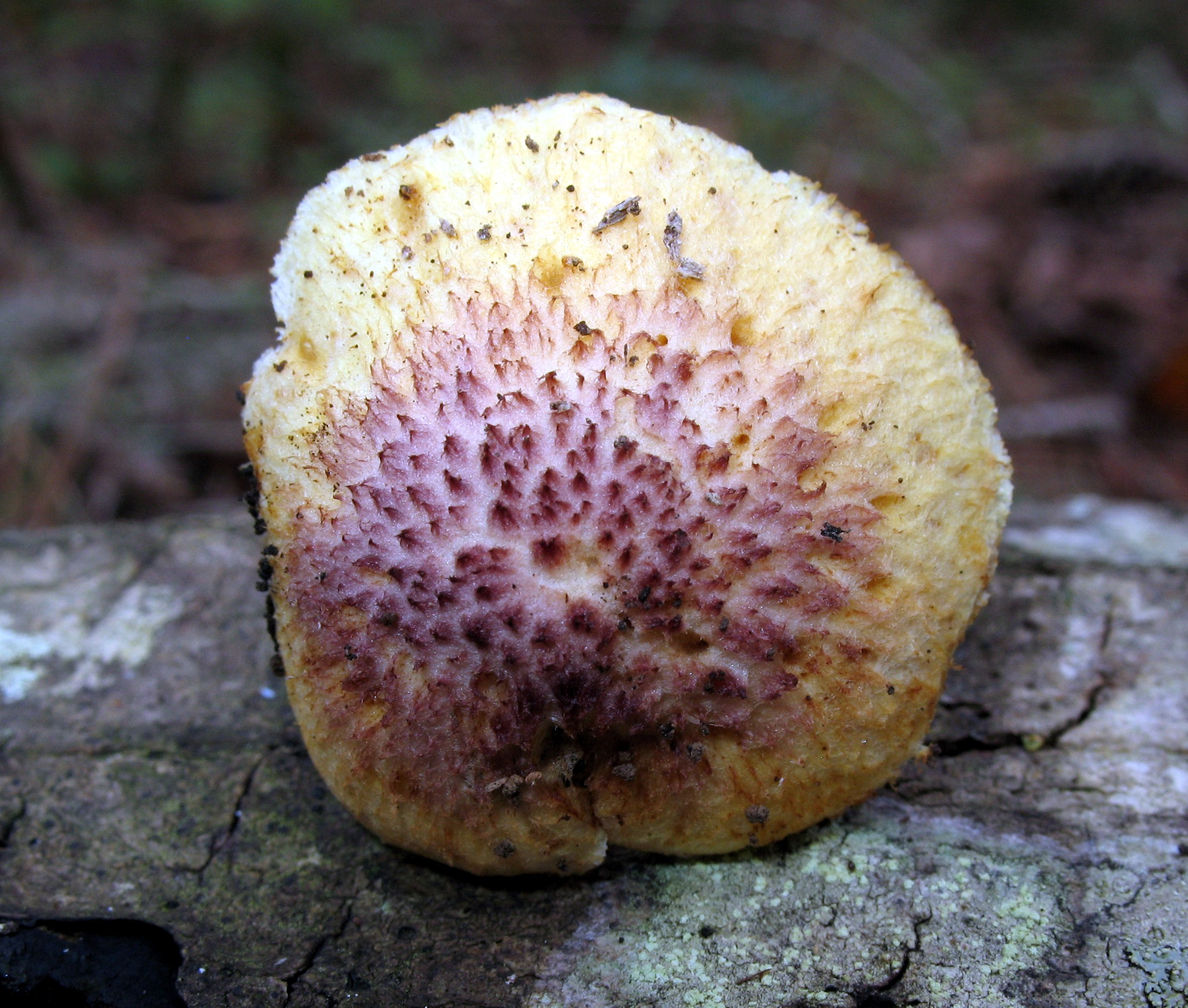

Scientific classification
- Domain: Eukaryota
- Kingdom: Fungi
- Division: Basidiomycota
- Class: Agaricomycetes
- Order: Agaricales
- Family: Hymenogastraceae
- Genus: Gymnopilus
- Species: G. peliolepis

Binomial name
- Gymnopilus peliolepis (Speg.) Singer

= Gymnopilus peliolepis =

Species of fungus

Gymnopilus peliolepis Mycological characteristics
- Gills on hymenium
- Cap is convex
- Hymenium is adnexed or adnate
- Ecology is saprotrophic

Gymnopilus peliolepis is a species of mushroom in the family Hymenogastraceae. It was given its current name by mycologist Rolf Singer in 1951.

== Phylogeny ==
This species is in the aeruginosus-luteofolius infrageneric grouping of the genus Gymnopilus.

== See also ==
- List of Gymnopilus species
