= Gymnopilus zempoalensis =

Scientific classification
- Kingdom: Fungi
- Division: Basidiomycota
- Class: Agaricomycetes
- Order: Agaricales
- Family: Hymenogastraceae
- Genus: Gymnopilus
- Species: G. zempoalensis

Binomial name
- Gymnopilus zempoalensis Guzmán & V.Mora (1984)

Species of fungus

Gymnopilus zempoalensis is a mushroom in the family Hymenogastraceae. Found in Mexico, it was described as a species new to science in 1984.

== See also ==
- List of Gymnopilus species
