= Gymnopilus velutinus =

Scientific classification
- Domain: Eukaryota
- Kingdom: Fungi
- Division: Basidiomycota
- Class: Agaricomycetes
- Order: Agaricales
- Family: Hymenogastraceae
- Genus: Gymnopilus
- Species: G. velutinus

Binomial name
- Gymnopilus velutinus (Petch) Singer

Species of fungus

Gymnopilus velutinus Mycological characteristics
- Gills on hymenium
- Cap is convex
- Hymenium is adnexed or adnate
- Ecology is saprotrophic

Gymnopilus velutinus is a species of mushroom in the family Hymenogastraceae.

== See also ==
- List of Gymnopilus species
