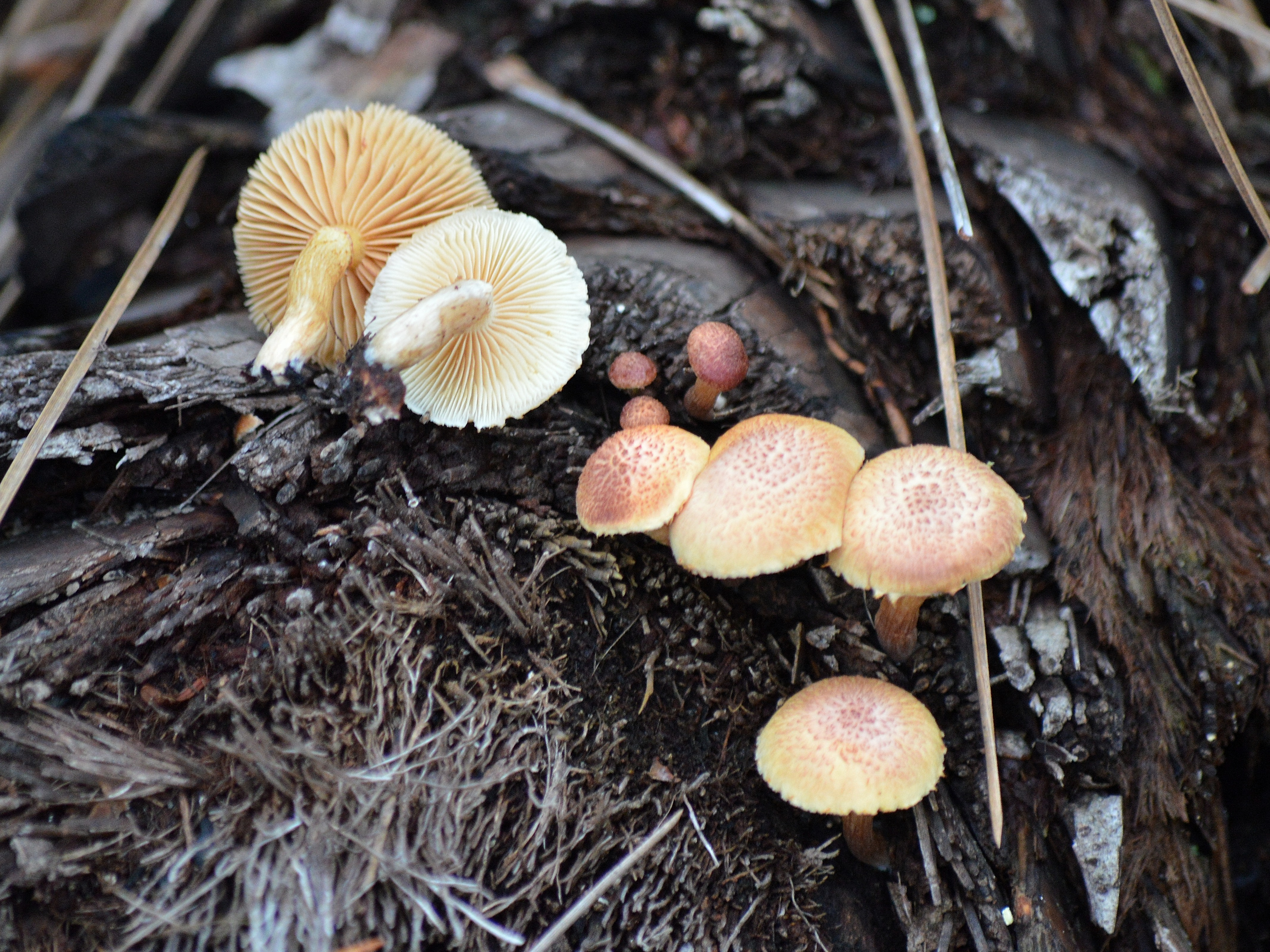

Scientific classification
- Domain: Eukaryota
- Kingdom: Fungi
- Division: Basidiomycota
- Class: Agaricomycetes
- Order: Agaricales
- Family: Hymenogastraceae
- Genus: Gymnopilus
- Species: G. palmicola

Binomial name
- Gymnopilus palmicola Murrill

= Gymnopilus palmicola =

Species of fungus

Gymnopilus palmicola Mycological characteristics
- Gills on hymenium
- Cap is convex
- Hymenium is adnexed or adnate
- Ecology is saprotrophic
- Edibility is inedible

Gymnopilus palmicola is a species of mushroom in the family Hymenogastraceae.

== Description ==
The cap is 2 to 5 centimetres (0.8 to 2.0 in) in diameter.

This species does not stain blue and therefore probably does not contain hallucinogenic compounds.

== Habitat and distribution ==
Gymnopilus palmicola grows on palm logs and on living orchids. It has been found in Cuba, Mexico, and Florida between March and September.

== See also ==
- List of Gymnopilus species
