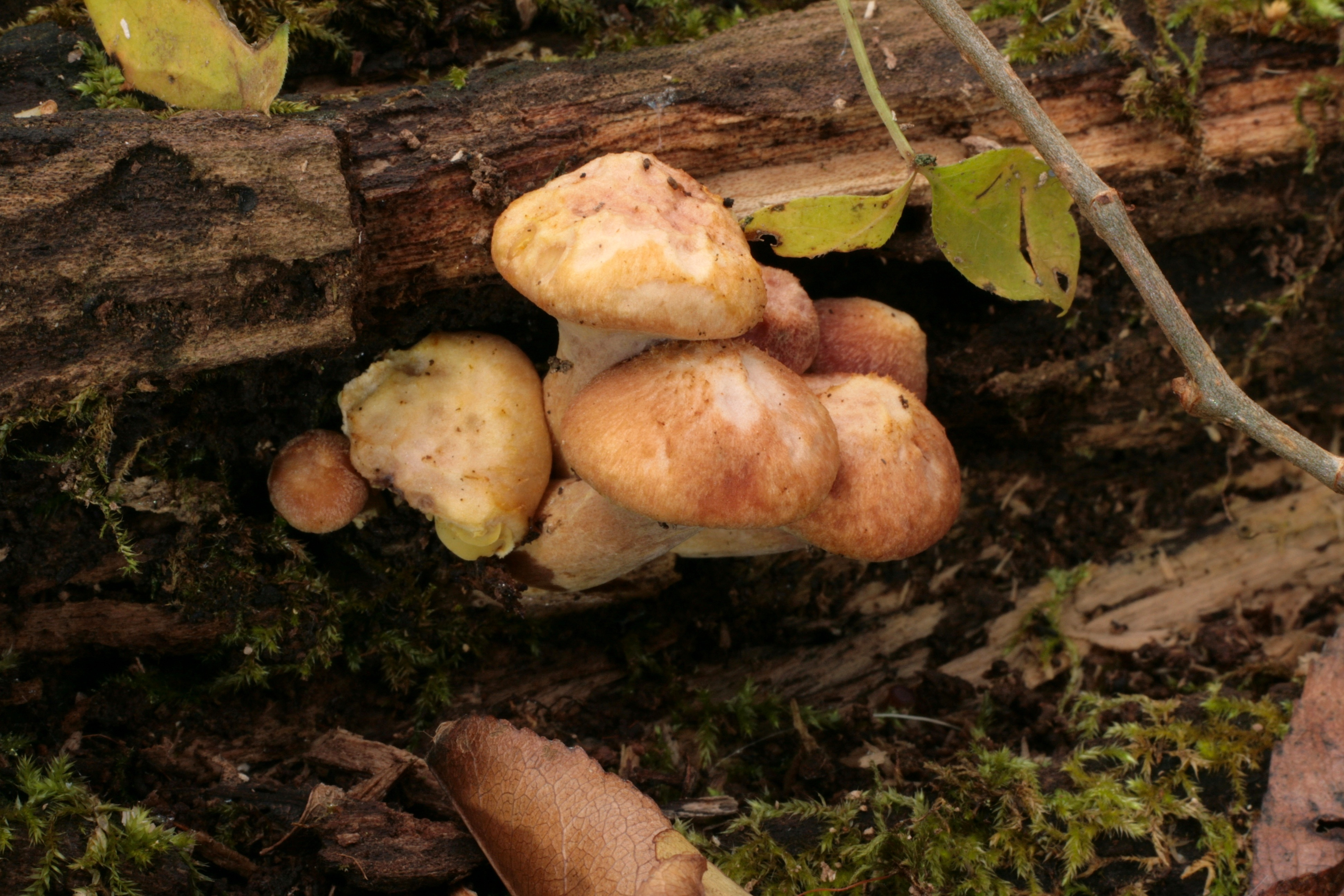

Scientific classification
- Kingdom: Fungi
- Division: Basidiomycota
- Class: Agaricomycetes
- Order: Agaricales
- Family: Hymenogastraceae
- Genus: Gymnopilus
- Species: G. braendlei

Binomial name
- Gymnopilus braendlei (Peck) Singer (1951)

Synonyms
- Flammula braendlei Peck (1904)

= Gymnopilus braendlei =

Species of fungus

Gymnopilus braendlei
- Mycological characteristics
- Gills on hymenium
- Cap is convex
- Hymenium is adnexed or adnate
- Spore print is yellow-orange
- Ecology is saprotrophic
- Edibility is psychoactive

Gymnopilus braendlei is a species of agaric fungus in the family Hymenogastraceae that contains the hallucinogens psilocybin and psilocin. It was originally described by mycologist Charles Horton Peck as Flammula braendlei, from specimens found in the District of Columbia in 1902.

== Description ==
- Pileus: 2.5–5 cm, hemispheric becoming convex, sometimes slightly umbilicate, hygrophanous, purplish when young then pinkish and lighter towards the margin, becoming yellowish in age with greenish stains, fibrillose, sometimes squamulose toward the center, flesh whitish, thin, staining greenish.
- Gills: Adnate, sometimes slightly sinuate in attachment, broad, close, whitish when young, becoming bright orangish brown to mustard yellow, becoming bright orangish brown in age.
- Spore print: Orangish brown.
- Stipe: 2.5–4 cm x 3–4 cm thick, more or less equal, pallid, sometimes yellowish at the base, fibrillose above, stuffed or hollow, veil fibrillose, sometimes leaving a silky zone but not forming an annulus.
- Taste: Bitter
- Microscopic features: Spores 6 x 8.5 x 4.5—5 μm ellipsoid to ovoid in face view, dextrinoid, verruculose, no germ pore. Pleurocystidia 22—33 x 6—7 μm, cheilocystidia 20—34 x 3—7 μm, no caulocystidia, clamp connections present.
- Bruising: Green or blue bruising at the base or on the pileus, and green spots on pileus likely.

== Distribution and habitat ==
Gymnopilus braendlei is found growing solitary or cespitose on tree stumps from June to November. It is widespread in the eastern U.S., and present in the western U.S.

== See also ==
- List of Gymnopilus species
