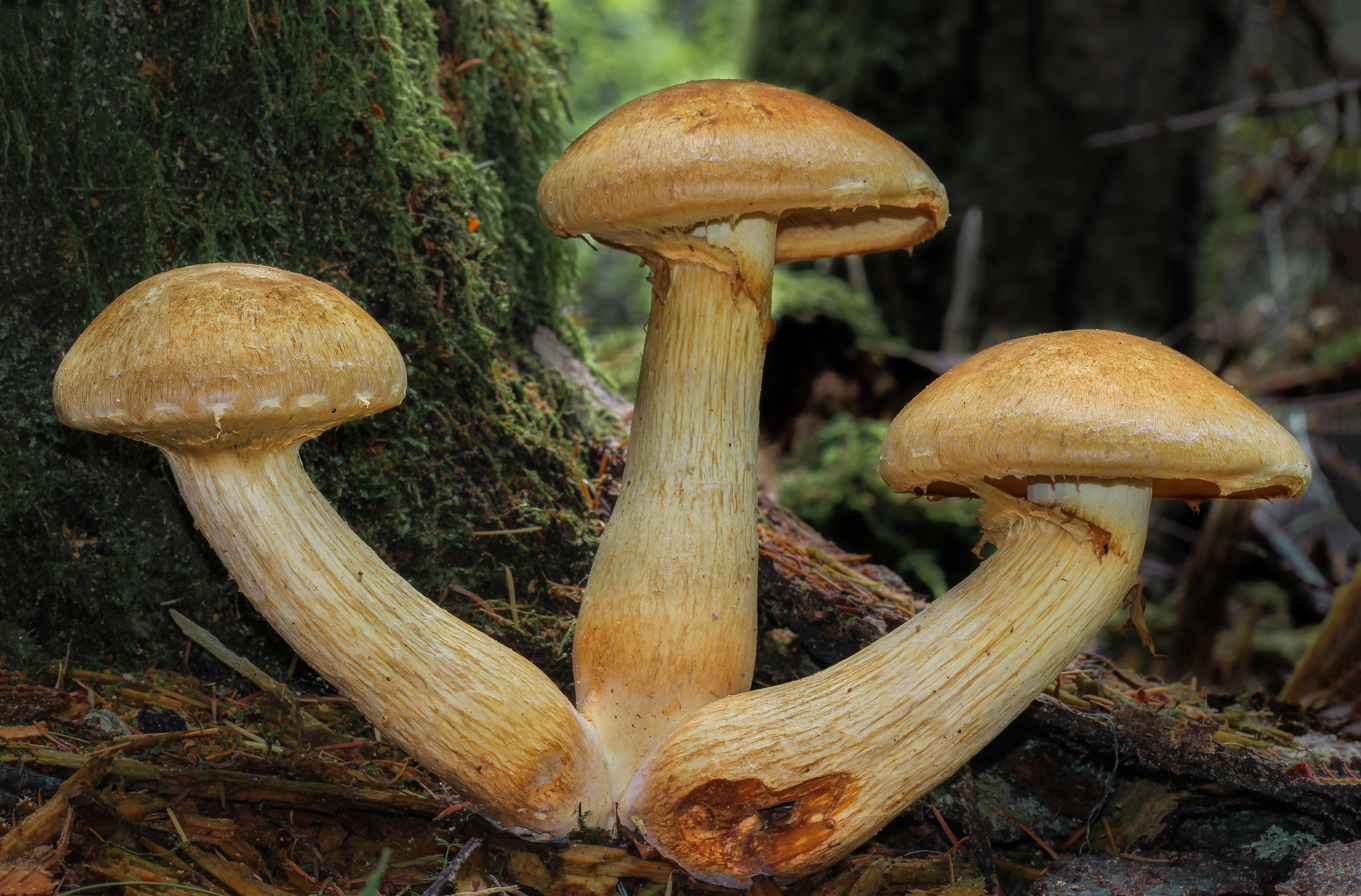

Scientific classification
- Domain: Eukaryota
- Kingdom: Fungi
- Division: Basidiomycota
- Class: Agaricomycetes
- Order: Agaricales
- Family: Hymenogastraceae
- Genus: Gymnopilus
- Species: G. viridans

Binomial name
- Gymnopilus viridans (Murrill)

Synonyms
- Flammula viridans

= Gymnopilus viridans =

Species of fungus

Gymnopilus viridans Mycological characteristics
- Gills on hymenium
- Cap is convex
- Hymenium is adnexed or adnate
- Spore print is yellow-orange
- Ecology is saprotrophic
- Edibility is psychoactive

Gymnopilus viridans is a mushroom in the family Hymenogastraceae. It contains the hallucinogens psilocybin and psilocin. It is a rarely documented species, the last known collection being from the US state of Washington in 1912.

== Description ==
- Pileus: — 8 cm, thick, convex with a large umbo, ochraceous, dry, with conspicuous light reddish brown scales that are sparse but become denser toward the center; flesh firm, becoming green-spotted where handled.
- Gills: Adnate, broad, crowded, edges undulate, dingy brown to rusty brown with age.
- Spore print: Rusty brown.
- Stipe: — 6 cm in height, 2 cm in diameter, enlarging below, solid, firm, concolorous with the cap.
- Microscopic features: Spores 7 x 8.5 x 4 — 5 μm ellipsoid, not dextrinoid, minutely verruculose, obliquely pointed at one end, no germ pore. Pleurocystidia absent, Cheilocystidia 20 — 26 x 5 — 7 μm, caulocystidia 35 — 43 x 4 — 7 μm, clamp connections present.

== Habitat and formation ==
Gymnopilus viridans is found growing cespitose on coniferous wood from June to November.
