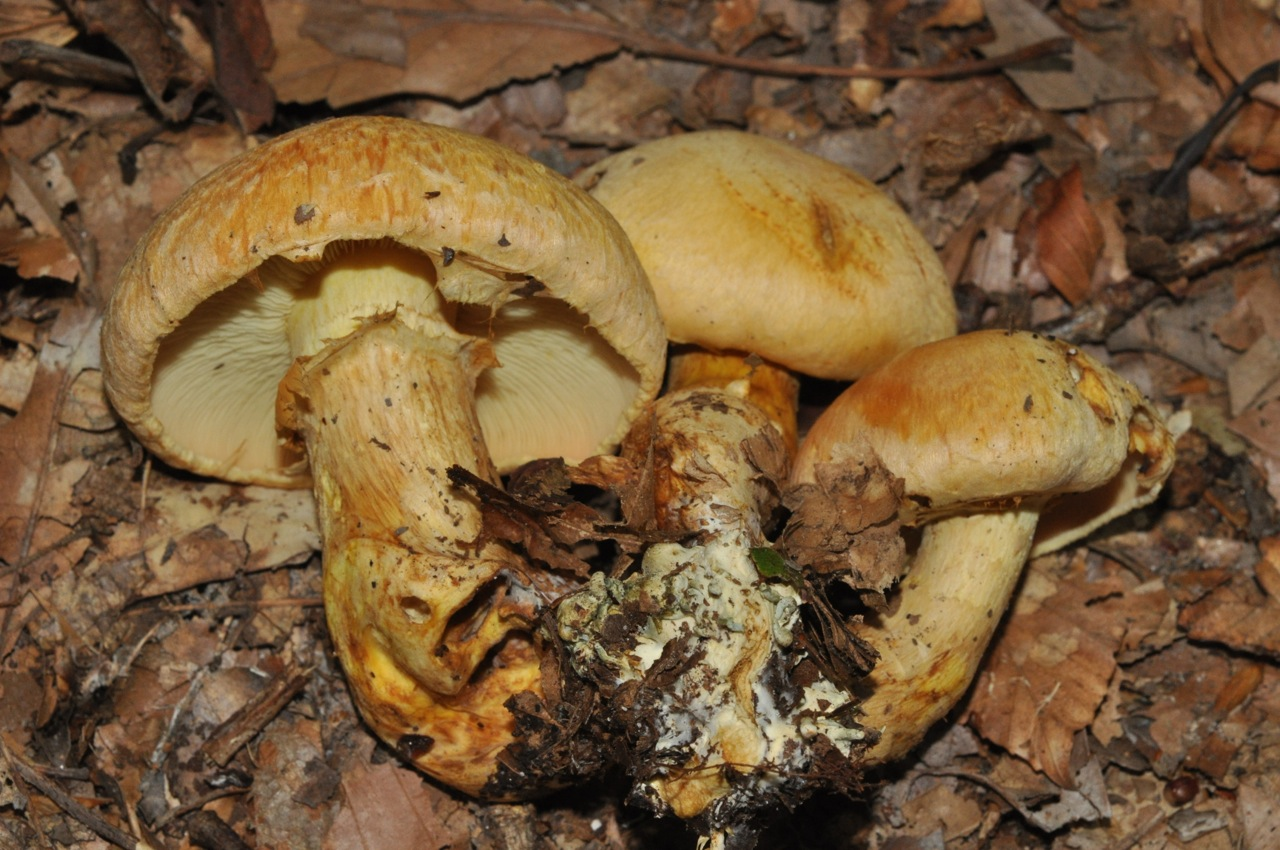

Scientific classification
- Kingdom: Fungi
- Division: Basidiomycota
- Class: Agaricomycetes
- Order: Agaricales
- Family: Hymenogastraceae
- Genus: Gymnopilus
- Species: G. validipes

Binomial name
- Gymnopilus validipes (Peck) Hesler

Synonyms
- Cortinarius validipes Gymnopolis magna

= Gymnopilus validipes =

Species of fungus

Gymnopilus validipes Mycological characteristics
- Gills on hymenium
- Cap is convex
- Hymenium is adnexed or adnate
- Stipe has a ring
- Spore print is yellow-orange
- Ecology is saprotrophic
- Edibility is psychoactive

Gymnopilus validipes is a mushroom in the family Hymenogastraceae. It is widely distributed in North America and Europe.

== Description ==
- Pileus: 7.5 — 15 cm, convex to broadly convex, margin deeply incurved at first, becoming revolute with age, dry, fibrillose or with small ochraceous brown scales, pale-yellow or ochraceous buff, flesh soft, whitish, yellowish near the gills.
- Gills: Adnate to uncinate, close, thin, yellowish white becoming cinnamon.
- Spore print: Orangish brown.
- Stipe: 10 — 13 cm long, 2.5 – 5 cm. thick, equal or swelling in the middle, fleshy-fibrous, solid, elastic, fibrillose, concolorous, white within, the cortina leaves only a faint ring on the stalk. The specific epithet validipes means "having a robust stalk".
- Taste: Mild, standing in contrast to closely related bitter-tasting species.
- Odor: Pleasant.
- Microscopic features: Spores 8 — 10 X 5 — 6 μm, ellipsoid.

Gymnopilus validipes contains the hallucinogens psilocybin and psilocin, the former at a concentration of around 0.12%.

== Habitat and formation ==
Gymnopilus validipes is found growing gregarious (in groups) to cespitose (in dense clumps) on tree stumps, hardwood logs and debris, widespread in the United States, common from the Great Lakes and eastward.

== See also ==
- Psilocybin mushrooms
- List of Psilocybin mushrooms
- List of Gymnopilus species
