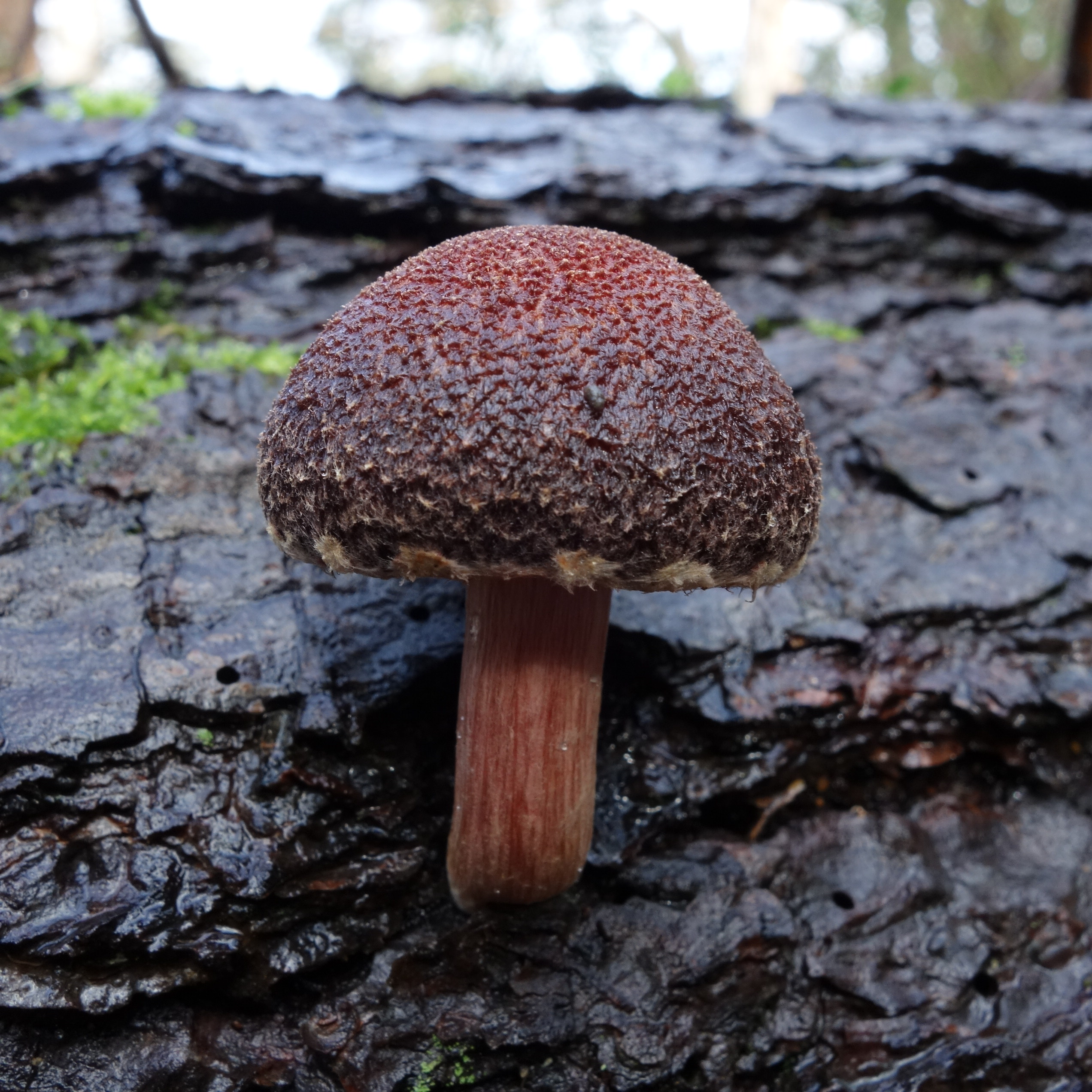

Scientific classification
- Kingdom: Fungi
- Division: Basidiomycota
- Class: Agaricomycetes
- Order: Agaricales
- Family: Hymenogastraceae
- Genus: Gymnopilus
- Species: G. dilepis

Binomial name
- Gymnopilus dilepis (Berk. & Broome) Singer (1951)

Synonyms
- Agaricus dilepis Berk. & Broome (1871); Flammula dilepis (Berk. & Broome) Sacc. (1887); Naucoria dilepis (Berk. & Broome) Cout. (1925)

= Gymnopilus dilepis =

Species of fungus

Gymnopilus dilepis
- Mycological characteristics
- Gills on hymenium
- Cap is convex or depressed
- Hymenium is adnate or decurrent
- Stipe is bare or has a ring
- Spore print is ochre
- Ecology is saprotrophic
- Edibility is psychoactive

Gymnopilus dilepis is a species of mushroom in the family Hymenogastraceae. This species is found in India, Malaysia, North America. It was given its current name by mycologist Rolf Singer in 1951. It contains psilocybin and related hallucinogenic substances.

== Phylogeny ==
Gymnopilus dilepis is in the lepidotus-subearlei infrageneric grouping within the genus Gymnopilus.

== See also ==
List of Gymnopilus species
