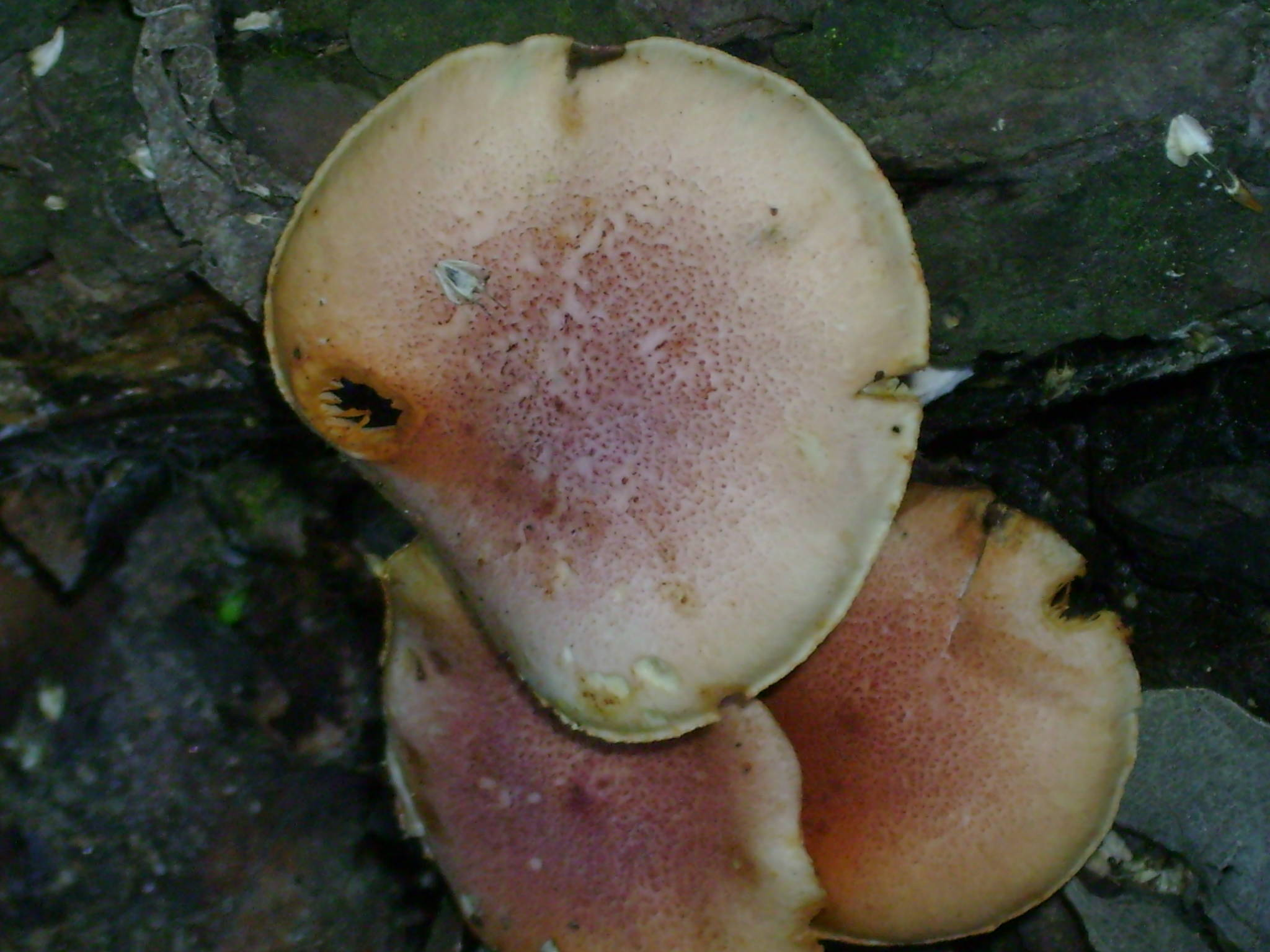

Scientific classification
- Domain: Eukaryota
- Kingdom: Fungi
- Division: Basidiomycota
- Class: Agaricomycetes
- Order: Agaricales
- Family: Hymenogastraceae
- Genus: Gymnopilus
- Species: G. subpurpuratus

Binomial name
- Gymnopilus subpurpuratus Guzm.-Dáv. & Guzmán (1991)

= Gymnopilus subpurpuratus =

Species of fungus

Gymnopilus subpurpuratus is a species of mushroom in the family Hymenogastraceae. The type specimen was found in Jalisco, Mexico, growing on rotting pine wood in a garden. The fungus was described as new to science in 1991 by Gastón Guzmán and his daughter Laura Guzmán Dávalos.

== Phylogeny ==
This species is in the aeruginosus-luteofolius infrageneric grouping in the genus Gymnopilus.

== See also ==
- List of Gymnopilus species
