= Gymnopilus subearlei =

Scientific classification
- Domain: Eukaryota
- Kingdom: Fungi
- Division: Basidiomycota
- Class: Agaricomycetes
- Order: Agaricales
- Family: Hymenogastraceae
- Genus: Gymnopilus
- Species: G. subearlei

Binomial name
- Gymnopilus subearlei R.Valenz., Guzmán & J.Castillo (1981)

Species of fungus

Gymnopilus subearlei Mycological characteristics
- Gills on hymenium
- Cap is convex
- Hymenium is adnexed or adnate
- Ecology is saprotrophic
- Edibility is psychoactive

Gymnopilus subearlei is a species of mushroom-forming fungus in the family Hymenogastraceae.

== Description ==
The cap is bright yellow to pale off-white yellow with amber fibrous scales, and ranges from 0.25 — 1.25in. in diameter. The stem is 0.25 — 2in. long and 0.06 — 0.25in. wide. It is white, fibrous, and stains yellow to brown where handled. The flesh of this mushroom stains blue and it contains the hallucinogen psilocybin. It has a yellowish-orange spore print.

== See also ==
- List of Gymnopilus species

== Phylogeny ==
This species is in the lepidotus-subearlei infrageneric grouping of the genus Gymnopilus.
