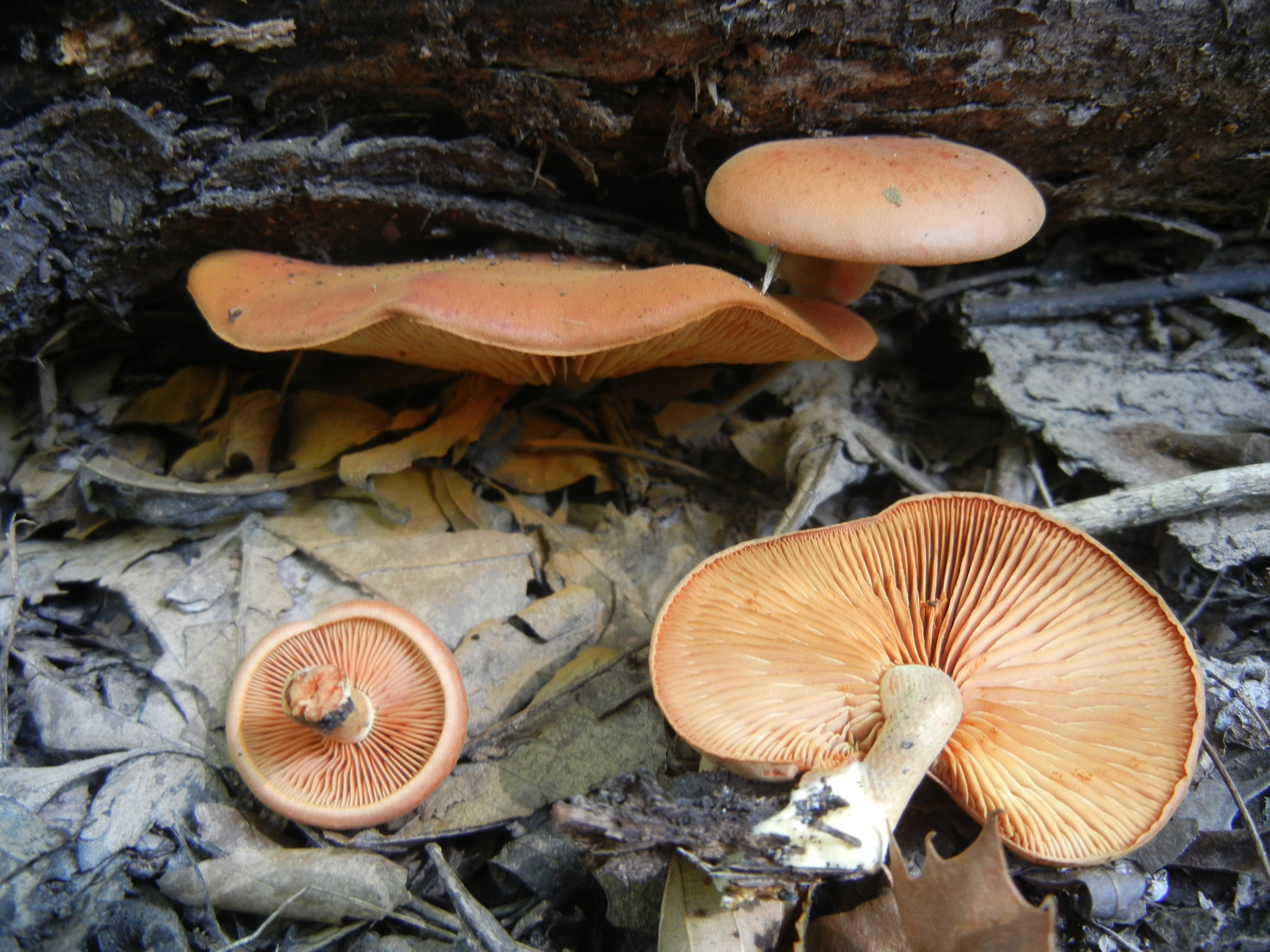

Scientific classification
- Kingdom: Fungi
- Division: Basidiomycota
- Class: Agaricomycetes
- Order: Agaricales
- Family: Hymenogastraceae
- Genus: Gymnopilus
- Species: G. liquiritiae

Binomial name
- Gymnopilus liquiritiae ((Persoon: Fries) Karsten)

= Gymnopilus liquiritiae =

Species of fungus

Gymnopilus liquiritiae
- Mycological characteristics
- Gills on hymenium
- Cap is convex
- Hymenium is adnexed or adnate
- Stipe is bare
- Spore print is yellow-orange
- Ecology is saprotrophic
- Edibility is inedible

Gymnopilus liquiritiae is a mushroom in the family Hymenogastraceae. The mushroom is widely distributed and grows in dense clusters on dead conifer wood. It has a rusty orange spore print, a bitter taste, and does not contain the hallucinogen psilocybin. One of its key distinguishing features is the lack of partial veil.

== Description ==
- Cap: 2–8 cm in diameter; initially convex, becoming nearly plane to nearly umbonate in age, dry, smooth, rusty brown to orange color, margin even, at length striatulate (with marked by small lines, grooves or ridges), cracking slightly in age, flesh pale yellow to pale orange.
- Gills: Close to crowded; broad, edges fimbriate, yellowish or pale orange, eventually orange; sometimes with reddish brown spots.
- Spore print: Rusty orange.
- Stipe: 3–7 cm long; 3—8 mm thick; more or less equal, or tapering in either direction; sometimes slightly, even to off-center; smooth or finely fibrous; whitish to pale orange; yellowish or rusty colored mycelium at the base of the stalk. No partial veil.
- Taste: Bitter
- Odor: Mild or sometimes like raw potatoes
- Microscopic features: Spores 7—8.5 x 4—5.5 μm, elliptical; pleurocystidia (inconspicuous), cheilocystidia, pileocystidia and caulocystidia present.

== Habitat and formation ==
Gymnopilus liquiritiae is a widely distributed wood rotting mushroom, subcaespitose on conifer, seems to prefer dead hardwood in the southern regions.

== See also ==
- List of Gymnopilus species
