= Laura Guzmán Dávalos =

Mexican mycologist and lichenologist

Laura Guzmán Dávalos (born 1961) is a Mexican mycologist, biologist and lichenologist. She has been the head of the botany and zoology departments at the University of Guadalajara (UdeG) from 1994 to 1998. From 2007 to 2014, she served as the general coordinator of the UdeG doctoral program in ecology, biosystematics, and natural and agricultural resources management.

== Early life and education ==
Guzmán-Dávalos was born in Mexico City in 1961, and is the daughter of the well-known ethnomycologist, Gaston Guzmán (1932–2016) who devoted his life and research to mushrooms of the genus Psilocybe, and their medicinal and divinatory uses of mushrooms by various Indigenous peoples of Mexico.

Guzmán-Dávalos received a degree in biology from the National School of Biological Sciences at the National Polytechnic Institute (IPN) in 1984, and her master's degree from the National Autonomous University of Mexico in 1994. She received her doctorate degree in 2004 from the same university.

== Research ==
Guzman-Davalos' mycological research includes the genera Ganoderma, Psilocybe, Pluteus and Gymnopilus (Cortinariaceae). She has published over 120 papers in peer-reviewed journals, seven book chapters and authored a book on lepiotaceous fungi. She has conducted mycological and lichenological exploration and field work in Belgium, China, Colombia, Cuba, Denmark, Ecuador, Finland, France, Guatemala, the Netherlands, Norway, Spain, Sweden, Switzerland, the United Kingdom the United States and Venezuela.

== Honors ==
- Sociedad Botánica de México.
- Del Comité Ejecutivo de la International Mycological Association
- International Association for Plant Taxonomy (IAPT).
- American Society of Plant Taxonomists (ASPT).
