= Charles Horton Peck =

American mycologist (1833–1917)

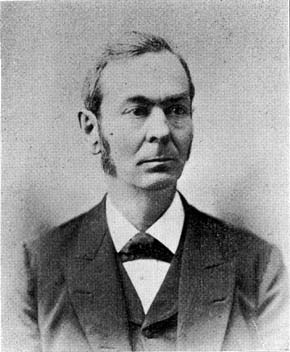
- Peck c. 1904 - 1907
- Born: March 30, 1833; Sand Lake, New York, USA
- Died: July 11, 1917 (aged 84); Menands, New York, USA
- Resting place: Sand Lake Union Cemetery
- Known for: Identifying over 2,700 new species of fungi
- Scientific career
- Fields: Mycology
- Workplaces: State Street High School; New York State Museum Herbarium

Charles Horton Peck (March 30, 1833 – July 11, 1917) was an American mycologist of the 19th and early 20th centuries. He was the New York State Botanist from 1867 to 1915, a period in which he described over 2,700 species of North American fungi.

== Biography ==
Charles Horton Peck was born on March 30, 1833, in the northeastern part of the town Sand Lake, New York, now called Averill Park. After suffering a light stroke early in November 1912 and then a severe stroke in 1913, he died at his house in Menands, New York, on July 11, 1917.

In 1794, Eleazer Peck (his great grandfather) moved from Farmington, Connecticut to Sand Lake, attracted by oak timber that was manufactured for the Albany market. Later on, Pamelia Horton Peck married Joel B., both from English descent, and became Charles Peck's parents. Even though his family was rich and locally prominent, his education was provincial.

During his childhood, he used to enjoy fishing and hunting pigeons using a net with his grandfather and when he was old enough, the school days were limited to only winter season because he assisted in his father's sawmill. Dr. Peck went for the first time with his father to collect large cranberries when he was eight or ten years old. Picking up cranberries was a family matter since his grandmother went with the Indians, who knew the swamp very well, to perform this activity.

== Education ==
Dr. Peck went for the first time to Albany in 1841 and went back ten years later to attend the State Normal School. While studying there a young lady assisting a botany and natural history class in a city Jewish school changed and redirected his future career after the flowers she collected from the woods for her class fell by accident to Dr. Peck and that awakened his interest in that field. After that he volunteered to join Prof. J. H. Salisbury's botany class, as an extra study. In 1852 he graduated from the State Normal School and went back home to work in the hayfield but used his free time to collect and study plants, and during the winter of 1852 to 1853 he taught a large district school in Poestenkill and Rensselaer counties. Then, for three years he gave classes in Schram's Collegiate Institute of Sand Lake.

Charles Peck took a preparatory course at Sand Lake College Institute and then started at Union College in the fall of 1855 to obtain his bachelor's degree of Arts in 1859, where he received an award of the Nott Prize Scholarship in honor for being one of the three students passing a special and extended examination. After graduating he went back to work at Sand Lake College Institute teaching classics, Mathematics, Botany, Greek, and Latin for three years. In 1862, Peck continued his studies at Union where he received his master's degree of Arts.

On June 10, 1908, at the 112th Commencement of Union College, Charles Peck obtains his PhD degree with a commemoration by Chairman Brownell: "By the direction of the Board of Trustees, I present for the degree of Doctor of Science, Charles Horton Peck of the Class of 1859. A graduate of this College, he has been for many years in public service as Botanist of the Empire State, Author, and Student of Nature and of Science. I request that the degree be conferred upon him". The President Alexander handed on the degree saying: "Charles Horton Peck. For faithful labors and high attainments in the realm of Science and for long and fruitful service, by the authority committed to me by the Trustees of Union College I confer upon you the degree of Doctor of Science and bid you enjoy all the rights, privileges and immunities pertaining thereto".

== Family ==
Prior to the Civil War, on April 10 of 1861 Peck married Mary Catherine Sliter, daughter of Calvin and Anna Maria Sliter. They had two sons: the oldest named Harry Sliter that was born on 1863 and the youngest was Charles Albert, born on 1870. Dr. Peck's wife died on February 26, 1912.

== Professional life ==
After turning down a job offer at Union for what he called "personal reasons", in 1863 Peck started to work in the classics department of the State Street High School, being known as "Cass's Academy" in Albany, New York. Because of this job he moved his family to Albany.

While working at Albany, he became interested in moss after noticing it on a stick of wood. This interest led him to meet Professor Alphonse Wood in Brooklyn, who directed Peck into Sullivant's work on mosses and this is when Peck started his first collection on moss, spending hours on identifying specimens. Afterwards, he presented his collection to the State where it was seen by Judge Geo. W. Clinton, a descendant of one of New York's most powerful and leading families. Clinton was also a botanist that got very impressed and interested in Peck and his work on mosses. Because of his commitment to promote natural history education through the state natural history museum, he was instrumental in securing Peck's appointment in the State Cabinet of Natural History and became Peck's source of encouragement to be a productive public official for science.

Thanks to Clinton, in 1866 Dr. Peck was a volunteer in the State herbarium. The herbarium contained the important collection of New York plants put together by John Torrey during the nineteenth century, which involved only plants until Peck added fungi. He got hired part-time at the museum on January 1, 1867, to complement the herbarium with plants of the state and by 1868 Peck was hired full-time for $1,500 a year to build the cryptogrammic collections. Dr. Peck began his first mycological collection in the State Herbarium after Rev. Moses A. Curtis, of North Carolina, motivated him. This collection and study of it, is what gives Charles Peck a worldwide name for all time. In 1913, he presented his resignation letter as State Botanist but it is not until January 26, 1915, that it was accepted by the University of the State of New York. Dr. Peck retired from his job after forty-eight years of working at the State herbarium.

== Affiliations ==
Dr. Peck contributed to a long series of annual reports of the State Botanist from 1867 to 1912. He belonged to part of the American Association for the Advancement of Science; he was a member of the Botanical Society of America; of the Albany Historical and Art Society; National Geographic Society; New England Botanical Club; American Forestry Association; and many mycological and scientific societies. Besides he was a loyal and noteworthy member of the Presbyterian Church for over sixty years.

== Personal life ==
Charles Peck did not expose much of his personality via his publications or letters; he was a private man. He loved fruits and vegetables, was accustomed to physical training and was therefore lean and fit. Peck's favorite non-work activities were climbing and walking the Adirondack and Catskill mountains. He avoided cursing, smoking tobacco, and drinking alcohol and was an early riser. He was a Republican but he would vote for the best candidate regardless of party. His first vote was for John C. Fremont who won the elections against James Buchanan in 1856. He was Christian with strong religious convictions and believed in a simple and direct theory of the world being governed by one creator.

== Mycological legacy ==
Peck's academic background was botanical, and his mycological knowledge was the result of self-study. Nevertheless, his work shaped American mycology.

Over the course of a 48 year career, Peck identified 2,700 new species of fungi, collected approximately 36,000 mycological specimens, and published over 4,000 pages of work. His most prominent area of contribution was Agaricaceae.

=== Taxa named after Peck ===
In 1978, mycologist Margaret Elizabeth Barr-Bigelow published Chapeckia, a genus of fungi in the family Sydowiellaceae, to honor Peck.

In 1908, mycologist Gertrude Simmons Burlingham described Lactarius peckii, named for Peck to recognize his extensive work in that genus.

== See also ==
- Category:Taxa named by Charles Horton Peck
