= William Murrill =

American botanist and mycologist (1869–1957)

William Alphonso Murrill
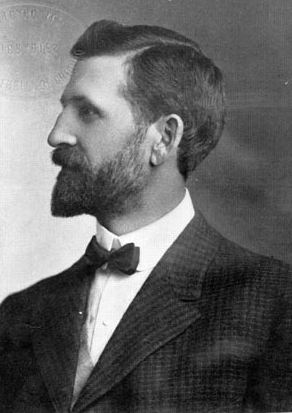
- William Alphonso Murrill
- Born: October 13, 1869; Lynchburg, Virginia, U.S.
- Died: December 25, 1957 (aged 88); Gainesville, Florida, U.S.
- Education: Virginia Agricultural and Mechanical College at Blacksburg - BSc (1887); Randolph Macon College - B.Sc. (1889), M.A. (1891); Cornell University - PhD (1900)
- Known for: Researching Hymenomycetes
- Awards: Holland Society of New York - Gold Medal (1923)
- Scientific career
- Fields: Mycology, Botany
- Workplaces: Bowling Green Seminary; Wesleyan Female Institute; DeWitt Clinton High School; New York Botanical Garden
- Doctoral advisor: G.F. Atkinson
- Other academic advisors: L.M. Underwood
- Author abbrev. (botany): Murrill

William Alphonso Murrill (October 13, 1869 – December 25, 1957) was an American mycologist, known for his contributions to the knowledge of the Agaricales and Polyporaceae. In 1904, he became the assistant Curator at the New York Botanical Garden (NYBG). He, along with the NYBG, founded the journal Mycologia and was its first editor for 16 years. Murrill was known to travel extensively to describe the mycota of Europe and the Americas. He traveled along the East Coast, Pacific Coast, Mexico and the Caribbean. Although Murrill was a very influential person at the NYBG, having worked his way up to become assistant director in 1908, his rather eccentric personality caused problems with his job. He went on annual collecting trips to Mexico, the Caribbean, Europe, and South America, sometimes, without informing any of his colleagues prior. These trips resulted in a cumulative total of 70,000 specimens, 1,400 of which are deposited in the NYBG. Murrill might have issued an exsiccata series under the title Polyporaceae of North America.

== Family life ==
Murrill married Edna Lee Lutrell on September 1, 1897. The two had an only child during their marriage, a boy born in 1899, who died in his infancy. This death would contribute to problems further on in their marriage, ultimately resulting in divorce in 1924.

== A Life Changing Event ==
For eight months in 1924, Murrill went on another trip to Europe but seemed to disappear; no one was even sure if he was still alive. The Garden filled his position; it was later discovered that Murrill had a kidney condition and was actually in a rural French hospital during these eight months, unable to send word back to his wife or the NYBG. When he finally returned to New York, Murrill was upset to learn that he had no job. The NYBG, in compensation, gave him a position that was much reduced in both pay and prestige. During this time, he was hospitalized intermittently for “nervous instabilities and physical exhaustion”. His wife, feeling neglected, divorced him during this time. Heartbroken and professionally dissatisfied, he then returned to his home state of Virginia to live in a log cabin, financially and mentally troubled.

Little was known about Murrill’s whereabouts until, in 1926, George F Weber, a mycologist and plant pathologist from University of Florida, was visiting a Gainesville resort called the Tin Can Tourist Camp along with his wife. In the recreation hall, they came across an unkempt and haggard, yet “tall, robust, dignified, pleasant stranger providing a piano concert for the transient tourists”. Weber soon recognized the stranger as none other than Murrill. It came to light later that Murrill had been frequently visiting Florida over the past years during the winter to collect mushrooms.

The following spring, while collecting in Florida, Murrill was afflicted with another kidney flare up. He spent the rest of the spring, and into the summer, recovering in the University of Florida Infirmary. Having recovered, Murrill found that it was now the peak of the Florida mushroom season, and asked Weber for some collecting supplies, a desk, and a microscope. Weber set Murrill up with a permanent desk and research space in the only spot he could find—a landing on a stairway near the University Herbarium. Weber also arranged for a remaining $600 in publication royalties to be sent to Murill and managed to get a small stipend for him. Murrill permanently relocated to Florida from Virginia, building a small house, and spending the last 34 years of his life there.

Murrill began collecting all over the campus and surrounding areas for the next 34 years of his life, describing many new species of fungi, of which 700 type-collections are deposited in the University of Florida Institute for Food and Agricultural Science’s Fungal Herbarium (FLAS). Murrill became a familiar figure around the Gainesville campus, known by many simply as “the Mushroom Man”. During the mushroom season, he would spend the morning gathering fungi in and around the campus, then return to his desk to describe and curate the collections. He would rarely return home during this time, but would work late into the evening, then fall asleep on a couch in the student union. The next morning the incoming students would rouse him and often treat him to breakfast.

While active in the community around Gainesville, in both scientific and cultural activities, for the next few decades, he eventually slowed although his enthusiasm never diminished. While reporting to the University Infirmary for an illness, he collapsed as the doctor was examining him. While Murrill was in his final days, he said that he did not want to die because there was too much interesting work yet to be done. William Alphonso Murrill died at the age of 88 on December 25, 1957, and along with him, the last surviving member of the early American Mycological Society.

== Education ==
Murrill obtained his Ph.D. at Cornell University in 1897, working under the supervision of G.F. Atkinson, a leading authority on the taxonomy of basidiomycetes. He started working as assistant curator at New York Botanical Garden herbarium and library in 1904, eventually becoming a curator (1919–1924). He also worked at the University of Florida.

== Publications ==
Murrill had 510 publications, including mycological and botanical papers and notes, general notes, miscellaneous reports, reviews, biographies, and popular articles on natural history.

=== Species Described ===
During his time, Murrill described some 1453 new species and varieties of Agaricales, Boletales, and Polyporales. Four genera he described are still valid to this day, Marasmiellus, Polymarasmius, Suillellus, and Volvariopsis. Most type specimens reside in NY and FLAS, but some are located at the University of Michigan (MICH), and University of Tennessee (TENN)

== See also ==
- Category:Taxa named by William Alphonso Murrill
