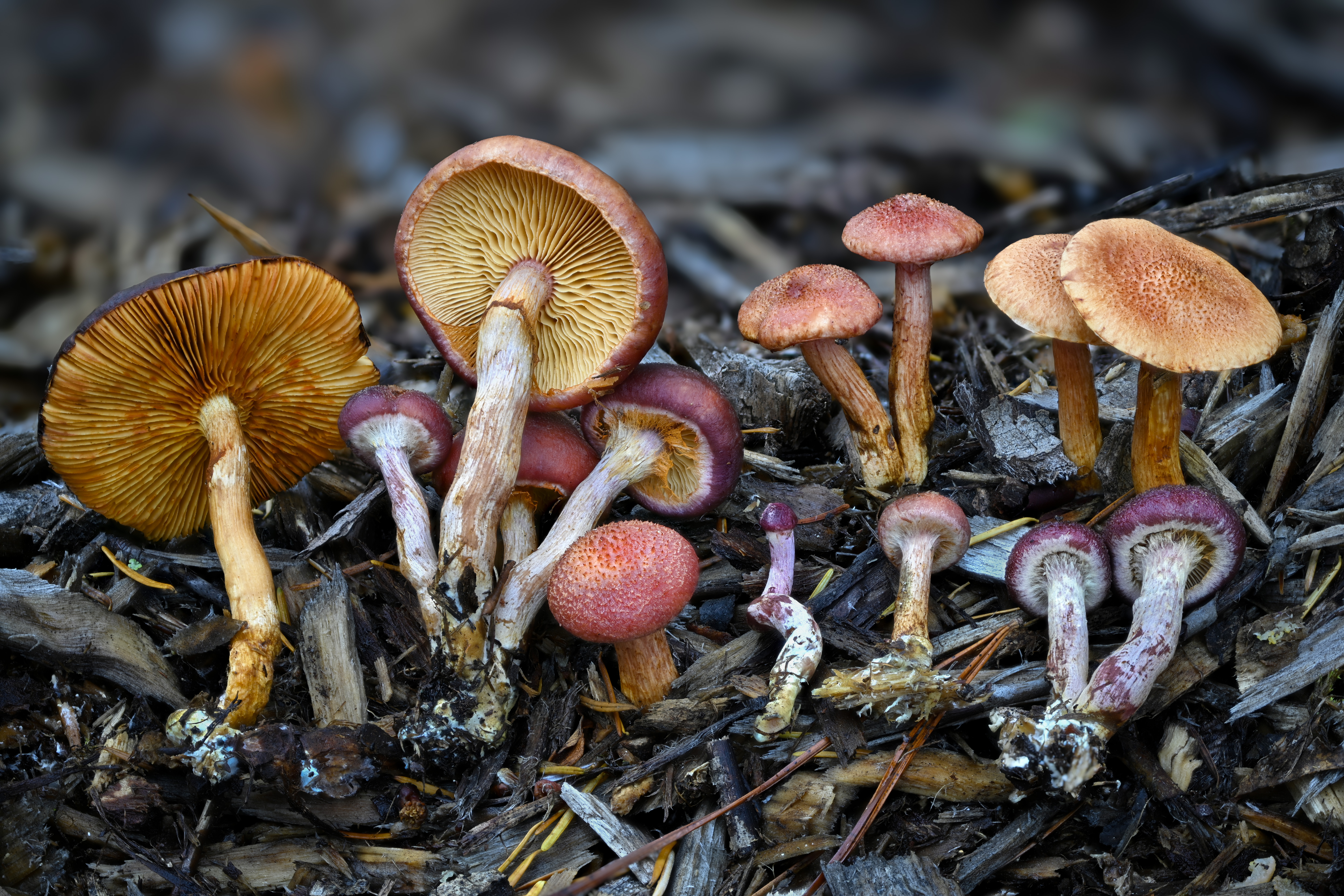
- Gymnopilus luteofolius

Scientific classification
- Kingdom: Fungi
- Division: Basidiomycota
- Class: Agaricomycetes
- Order: Agaricales
- Family: Hymenogastraceae
- Genus: Gymnopilus; P.Karst.

Type species
- Gymnopilus liquiritiae (Pers.) P.Karst. (1879)

Diversity
- c. 200 species

= Gymnopilus =

Genus of fungi

Gymnopilus is a genus of gilled mushrooms within the fungal family Galerinaceae containing over 200 rusty-orange spored mushroom species.

== Description ==
The fruit body is typically reddish brown to rusty orange to yellow, medium to large, often with a well-developed veil.

=== Similar genera ===
Members of Pholiota and Cortinarius are easy to confuse with Gymnopilus. Pholiota can be distinguished by its viscid cap and duller (brown to cinnamon brown) spores, and Cortinarius grows on the ground. Beginners can confuse Gymnopilus with Galerina, which contains deadly poisonous species.

== Taxonomy ==
Gymnopilus was formerly divided among Pholiota and the defunct genus Flammula. The genus has over 200 species worldwide.

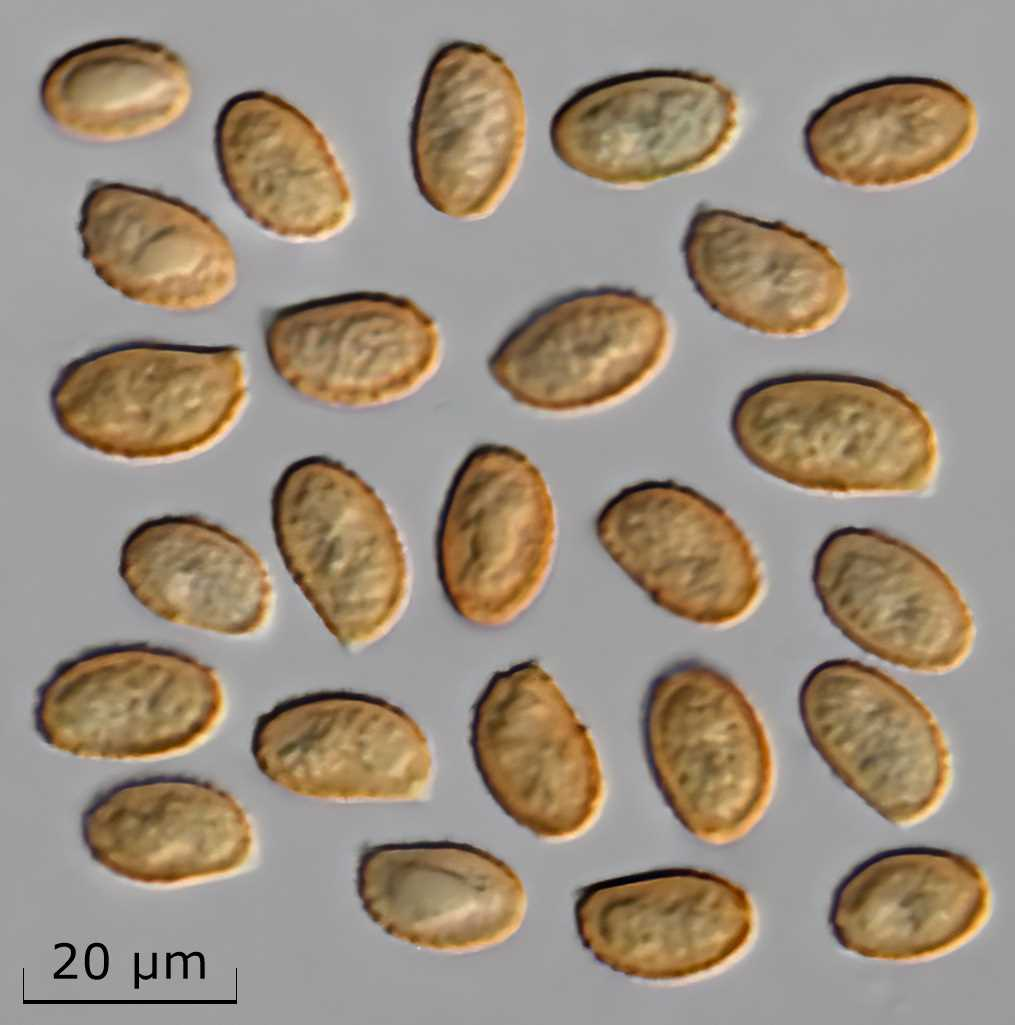
Gymnopilus luteofolius spores

=== Psychoactive species ===
Fourteen members of Gymnopilus contain psilocybin, although their bitter taste often deters recreational users. These species include G. aeruginosus, G. braendlei, G. cyanopalmicola, G. dilepis,G. intermedius, G. junonius, G. luteofolius, G. luteoviridis, G. luteus, G. purpuratus, G. subearlei, G. subpurpuratus, G. validipes and G. viridans. Subspecies of G. junonius from Japan are reported to contain psilocybin, while some western North American members do not.

Several species of Gymnopilus contain bis-noryangonin [4-hydroxy-6-(4-hydrostyryl)-2-pyrone] and hispidin, which are closely related to the alpha-pyrones found in kava.

=== Phylogeny ===
A 2003 phylogenetic study identified five well-supported clades within Gymnopilus:

1. the spectabilis-imperialis group
2. nevadensis-penetrans group
3. a clade formed by G. underwoodii, G. validipes and G. cf. flavidellus
4. aeruginosus-luteofolius group
5. lepidotus-subearlei group

Although the genus Gymnopilus was found to be monophyletic, the phylogenetically related groups do not support the traditional infrageneric classifications based on morphology.

=== Etymology ===
The name means naked pileus.

== Habitat ==
Most members of Gymnopilus grow on wood but at times may appear terrestrial if the wood is buried or decomposed.
