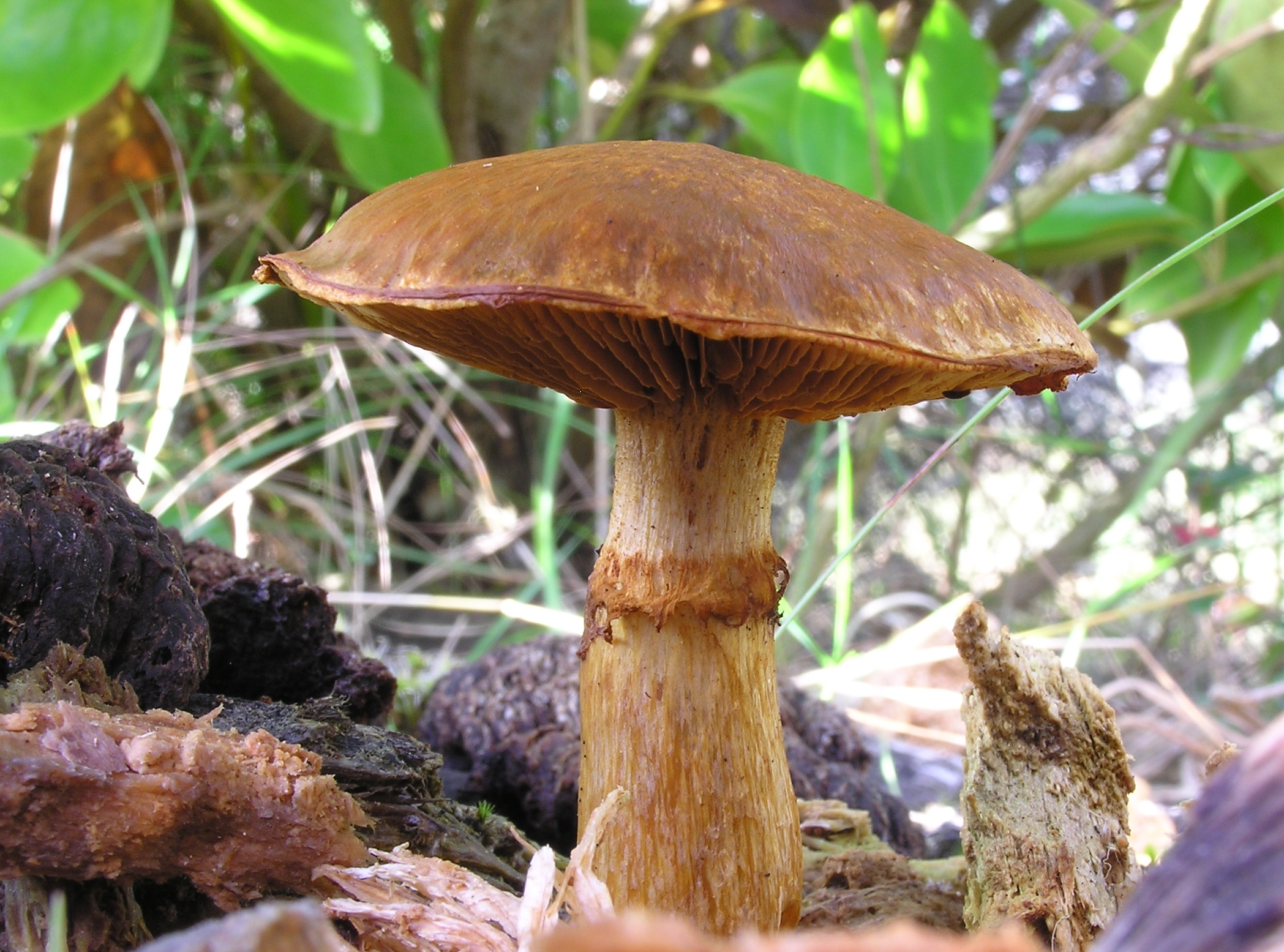

Scientific classification
- Kingdom: Fungi
- Division: Basidiomycota
- Class: Agaricomycetes
- Order: Agaricales
- Family: Hymenogastraceae
- Genus: Gymnopilus
- Species: G. junonius

Binomial name
- Gymnopilus junonius (Fr.) P.D.Orton (1960)
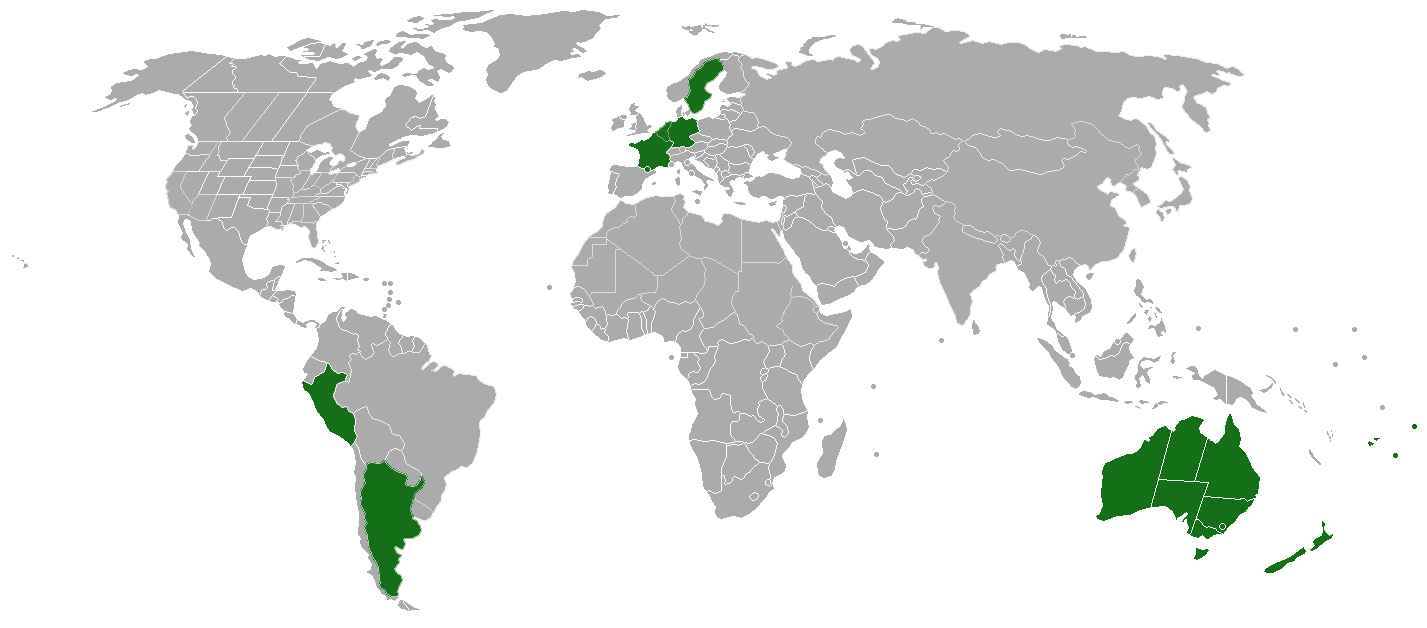
- Approximate range of Gymnopilus junonius

Synonyms
- Agaricus aureus Bull. (1782); Agaricus junonius Fr. (1821); Lepiota aurea Gray (1821); Pholiota junonia (Fr.) P.Karst. (1879); Pholiota grandis Rea (1903); Pholiota spectabilis var. junonia (Fr.) J.E.Lange (1940); Gymnopilus spectabilis var. junonius (Fr.) Kühner & Romagn. (1953)

= Gymnopilus junonius =

Species of fungus

Gymnopilus junonius
- Mycological characteristics
- Gills on hymenium
- Cap is convex
- Hymenium is adnate
- Stipe has a ring
- Spore print is reddish-brown
- Ecology is saprotrophic
- Edibility is inedible

Gymnopilus junonius is a type of mushroom-forming fungus in the family Hymenogastraceae. Commonly known as the spectacular rustgill, or laughing Jim, this large orange mushroom is typically found growing on tree stumps, logs, or tree bases. It is found in Europe, Australasia and South America. It is inedible and contains some neurotoxins.

== Description ==
The cap ranges from 5–30 cm (2–12 in) across, bun-shaped at first, then is convex to flat; it is bright yellow-orange in younger specimens and orange-brown or reddish brown in older ones, with a dry scaly surface. The flesh is yellow, the odor mild and taste bitter. The stem is 5–25 cm (2–10 in) long, 1–5 cm thick, and often narrows near the base. The frail ring is dusted with rusty orange spores, and the gill attachment to the stem is adnate to sub-decurrent. It stains red with KOH and turns green when cooked. The spore print is rusty brown.

Unlike psychoactive relatives in the Psilocybe genus, G. junonius lacks psilocybin and does not stain blue, but smaller specimens occasionally exhibit bruising. This mushroom usually grows in clusters from several to several dozen individuals, but sometimes grows solitary. It is inedible due to its bitter taste.

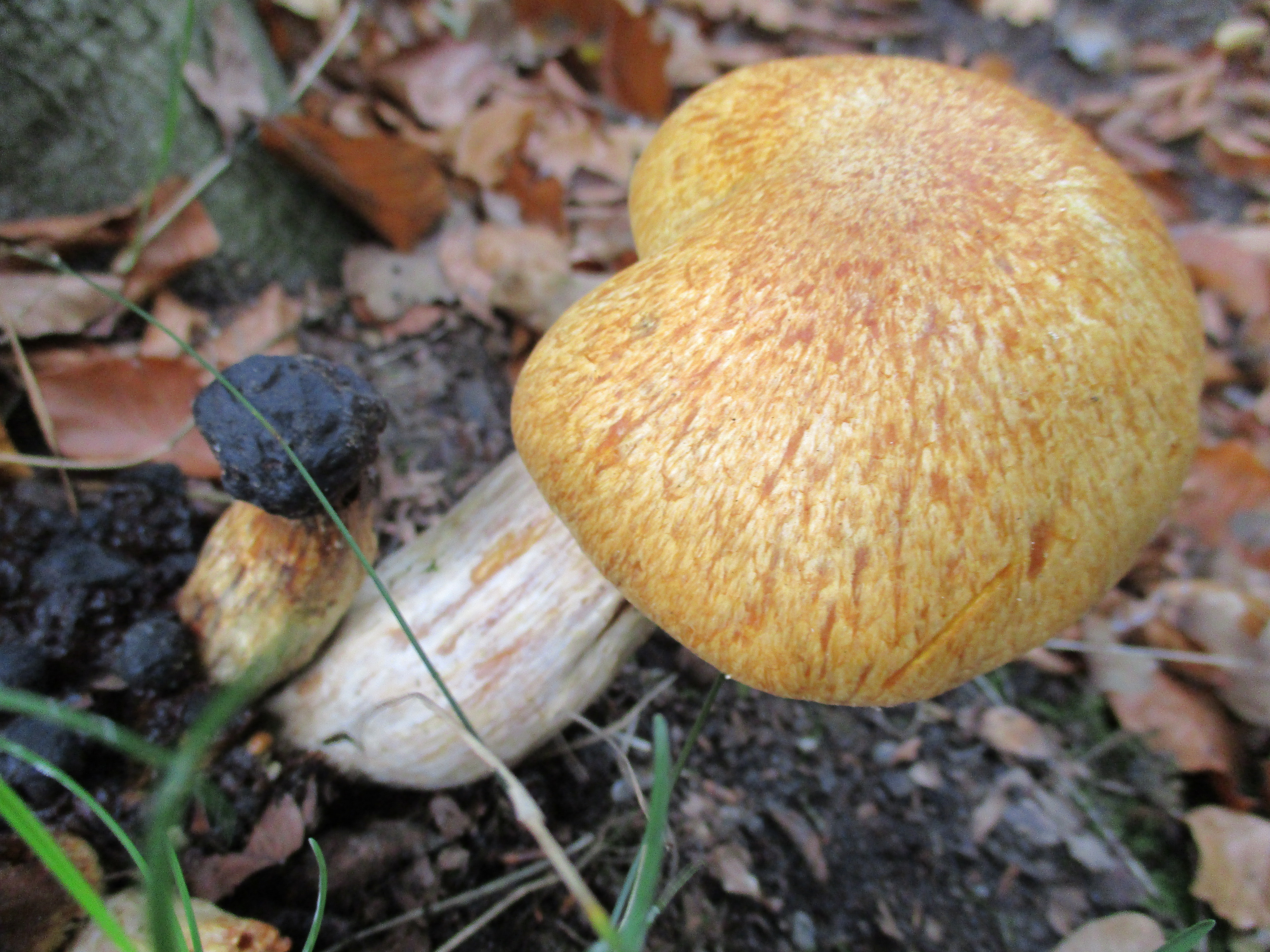
Wild specimen

=== Similar species ===
This mushroom is often mistaken for Gymnopilus ventricosus, which also contains no psilocybin, and G. luteus and G. subspectabilis, which do. It also resembles Armillaria mellea and Omphalotus olivascens.

== Distribution and habitat ==
Gymnopilus junonius is found in Europe, Australasia and South America. It grows in dense clusters on stumps and logs of hardwoods and conifers. This mushroom is most common in moist, lowland wooded areas near rivers.

This species does not occur in North America, with similar mushrooms often being misidentified.

== Biochemistry ==
This mushroom contains bis-noryangonin and hispidin, which are structurally related to alpha-pyrones found in kava. It also contains neurotoxins known as oligoisoprenoids, such as gymnopilin.

== See also ==
- List of Gymnopilus species
