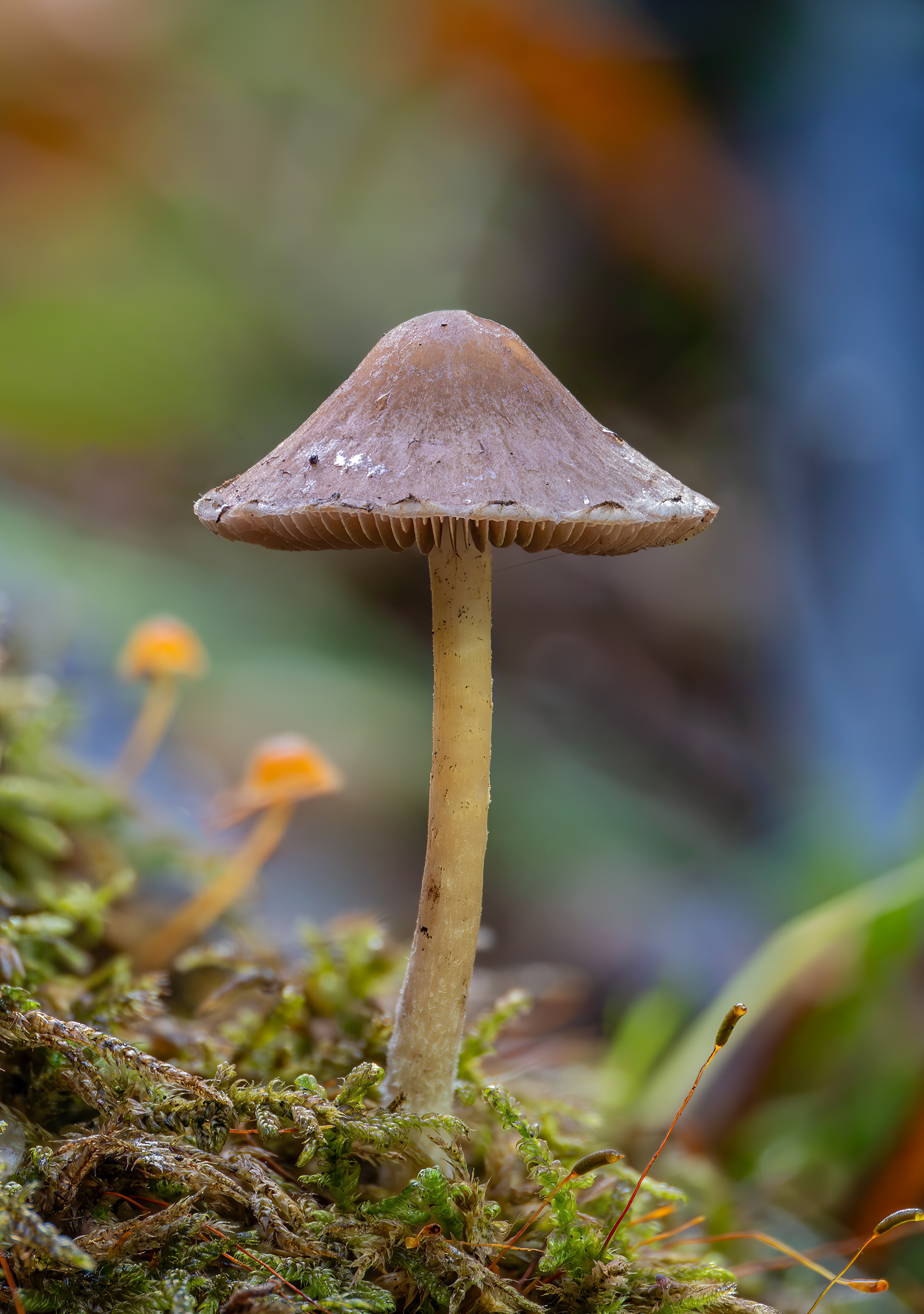
- Entoloma conferendum, Bruderwald forest, Bamberg, Germany

Scientific classification
- Kingdom: Fungi
- Division: Basidiomycota
- Class: Agaricomycetes
- Order: Agaricales
- Family: Entolomataceae
- Genus: Entoloma
- Species: E. conferendum

Binomial name
- Entoloma conferendum (Britzelm.) Noordel. (1980)

Synonyms
- Agaricus conferendus Britzelm. (1881); Nolanea conferenda (Britzelm.) Sacc. (1887); Nolanea staurospora Bres. (1882); Entoloma staurosporum (Bres.) E. Horak (1976)

= Entoloma conferendum =

Star Pinkgill

Species of fungus

Entoloma conferendum is a species of agaric (gilled mushroom) in the family Entolomataceae. In the UK it has been given the recommended English name of Star Pinkgill, based on its distinctive basidiospores. The species is widespread throughout Europe, occurring mainly in agriculturally unimproved grassland, and has also been reported from North America.

== Taxonomy ==
The species was first described by German mycologist Max Britzelmayr in 1881 as Agaricus conferendus. Italian mycologist Pier Andrea Saccardo transferred it to the genus Nolanea in 1887 and, when Nolanea was synonymized with Entoloma, Dutch mycologist Machiel Noordeloos transferred it to the latter genus in 1980. For many years the species was known as Nolanea staurospora, now considered a later synonym.

== Description ==
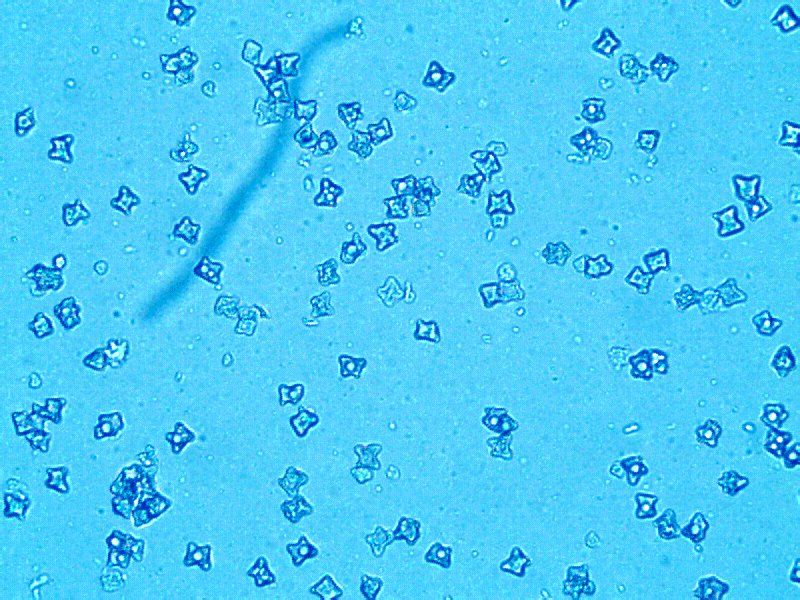
Distinctive stellate basidiospores of Entoloma conferendum

Basidiocarps are agaricoid, up to 80 mm (3 in) tall, the cap conical becoming convex with age, up to 60 mm (2.5 in) across. The cap surface is smooth, striate at margins when moist, grey-brown to ochraceous brown. The lamellae (gills) are white becoming pink from the spores. The stipe (stem) is smooth, slender, and conspicuously silvery striate, the striations often slightly twisted, lacking a ring. The spore print is pink, the spores (under a microscope) multi-angled and stellate, inamyloid, measuring about 7.5 to 13 μm across.

== Distribution and habitat ==
The Star Pinkgill is common and widespread in Europe. Like many other European pinkgills, it typically occurs in old, agriculturally unimproved, short-sward grassland (pastures and lawns), but may sometimes occur in woodland and bogs. The species has also been reported from North America.
