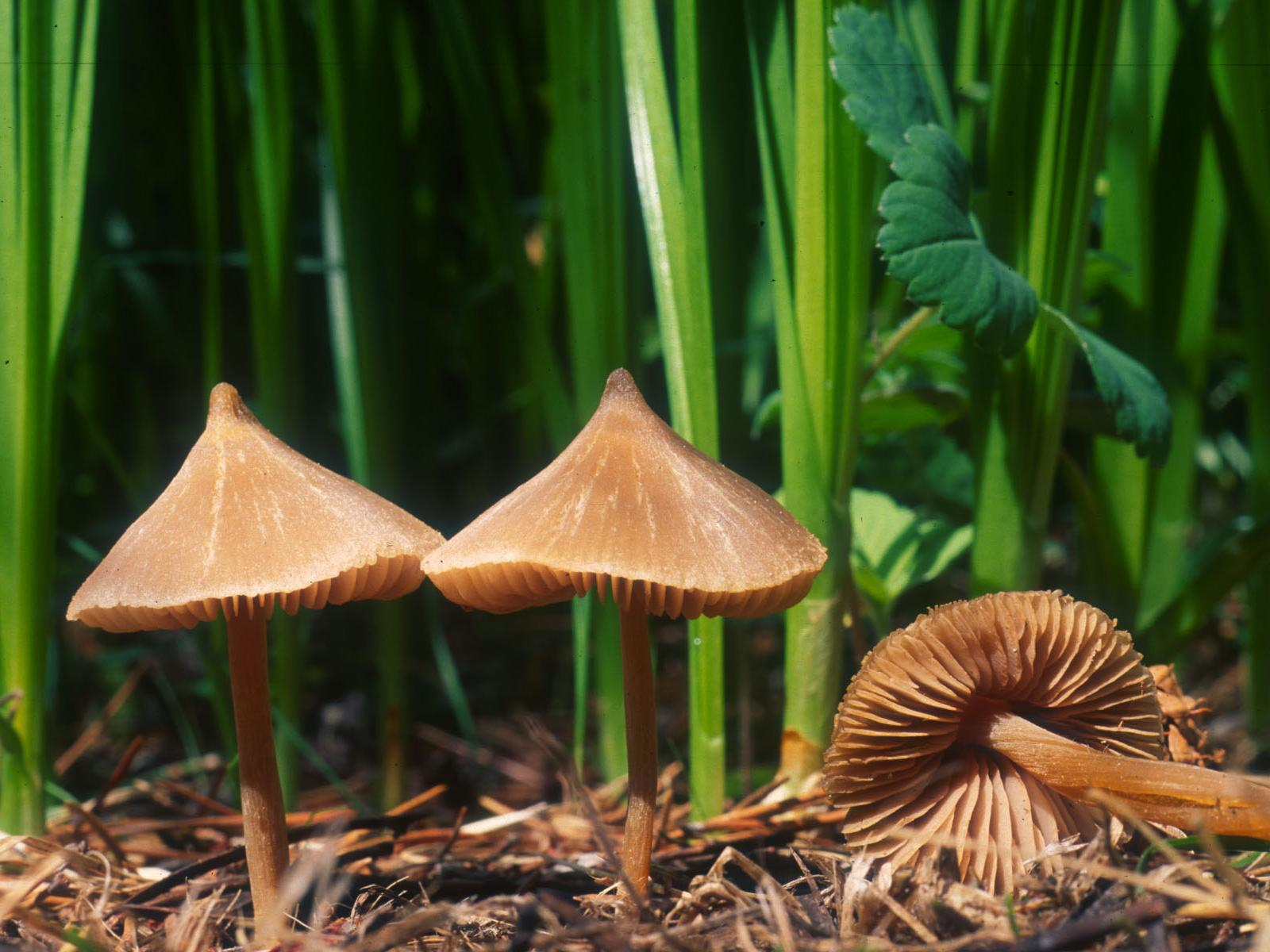

Scientific classification
- Kingdom: Fungi
- Division: Basidiomycota
- Class: Agaricomycetes
- Order: Agaricales
- Family: Entolomataceae
- Genus: Entoloma
- Species: E. holoconiotum

Binomial name
- Entoloma holoconiotum (Largent & Thiers) Noordel. & Co-David (2009)

Synonyms
- Nolanea holoconiota Largent & Thiers (1972)

= Entoloma holoconiotum =

Species of fungus

Entoloma holoconiotum is a mushroom in the family Entolomataceae. It was originally described as Nolanea holoconiota by David Largent and Harry Thiers in 1972. Machiel Noordeloos and Co-David transferred it to the genus Entoloma in 2009. The species can be found in conifer forests in western North America.

The cap is tan or orangish and ranges from 2–6 cm in diameter. The gills are white. The stalks are pale yellow, measuring 3–7 cm tall and 3–4 mm wide. The spores are brownish pink.

Similar species include Entoloma cuneatum, E. propinquum, and E. vernum.

== See also ==
- List of Entoloma species
