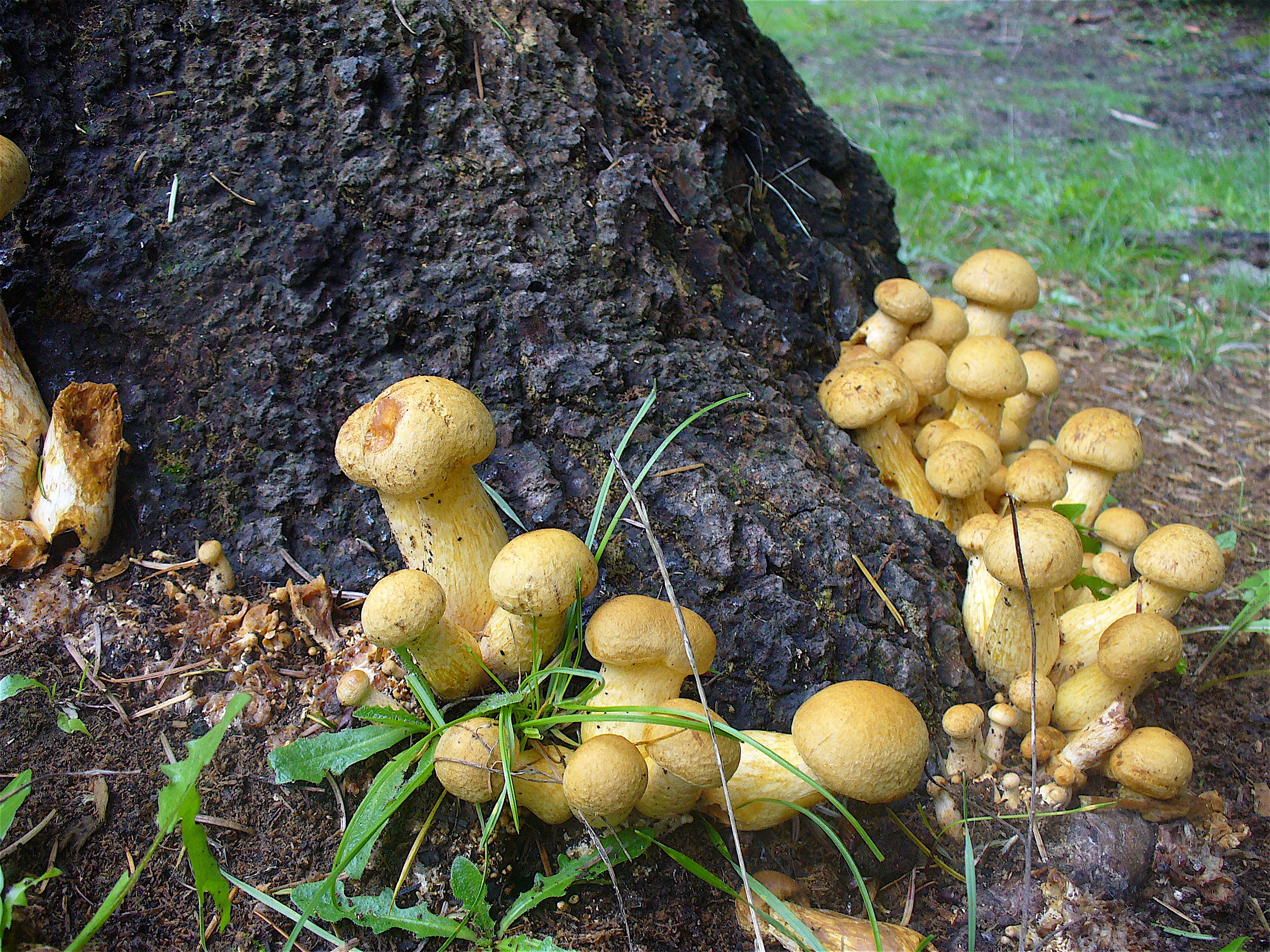

Scientific classification
- Kingdom: Fungi
- Division: Basidiomycota
- Class: Agaricomycetes
- Order: Agaricales
- Family: Hymenogastraceae
- Genus: Gymnopilus
- Species: G. ventricosus

Binomial name
- Gymnopilus ventricosus (Earle) Hesler (1969)

Synonyms
- Pholiota ventricosa Earle (1902)

= Gymnopilus ventricosus =

Gymnopilus ventricosus
- Mycological characteristics
- Gills on hymenium
- Cap is convex
- Hymenium is adnexed or adnate
- Stipe has a ring
- Spore print is ochre
- Ecology is saprotrophic
- Edibility is inedible

Gymnopilus ventricosus, commonly known as the jumbo gym or western jumbo gym, is a species of mushroom in the family Hymenogastraceae. It was first described from the Stanford University campus by Franklin Sumner Earle as Pholiota ventricosa in 1902.

== Description ==
The cap is 5 to 30 cm (2 to 11 3/4 in) or larger in diameter, bright yellow-orange to rusty orange, covered with minute yellow hairs, sometimes becoming scaly. The flesh is thick, yellow and bitter. The gills are yellow to rusty orange, close, adnate to slightly decurrent. The stipe is 7-21 cm long, 1-4 cm thick, yellow-orange, streaked with brown fibrils, club-shaped or ventricose, usually narrowed at the base; partial veil yellowish, forming a superior membranous ring. White mycelium at the base of the stipe.

Spores are ellipsoid or ovoid, warty, 7.5–9 x 4–5.5μm. The spore print is rusty brown to rusty orange. Clamp connections are present.

This species contains no psilocybin, and is considered inedible; it is very bitter.

== Habitat and ecology ==
Gymnopilus ventricosus grows in groups or dense tufts on dead wood or living pines, also on conifers and hardwoods.

== See also ==
- List of Gymnopilus species
