= Genevieve Gates =

Australian mycologist, ecologist, and taxonomist

Genevieve Maria Gates
- Born: 1952
- Education: University of Tasmania
- Scientific career
- Fields: Mycology, Taxonomy
- Thesis: Coarse woody debris, macrofungal assemblages, and sustainable forest management in a Eucalyptus obliqua forest of southern Tasmania. (2009)
- Author abbrev. (botany): G.M.Gates

Genevieve M. Gates is an Australian mycologist, ecologist, and taxonomist who is particularly focused on the fungal diversity of Tasmania.

== Work and encouragement of citizen science ==
Gates started to publish articles on the macrofungi of Tasmania in 2002 with her long-time collaborator David Ratkowsky, and finished her PhD in 2009. In 2014 Gates and Ratkowsky then went on to publish A Field Guide to Tasmanian Fungi, which at the time was the only in-print work on fungi of the island, and was also a co-author in the laminated field booklet FungiFlip: A pictorial guide to Tasmanian fungi. She is a coauthor of The Entolomataceae of Tasmania, a major study of the genus Entoloma in Tasmania.

She is an honorary associate at the University of Tasmania, and volunteers at the Herbarium of the Tasmanian Museum and Art Gallery. Gates is also called upon to provide advice to medical professionals, when a patient is suspected of ingesting poisonous fungi.

In her efforts to encourage greater public interest in fungi, Gates established and was involved in the management of multiple special interest Facebook groups. These included creating the Tasmanian Fungi Facebook page in 2014, and the Field Naturalists of Tasmania Facebook page in 2015. Gates also regularly leads excursions to look for fungi, aimed at interested amateurs, and gives lectures and talks.

== Botanical legacy ==
Gates has named over 70 species of fungi, including:

- Entoloma albidocoeruleum G.M.Gates & Noordel.
- Entoloma asprellopsis G.M.Gates and Noordel.
- Entoloma austroprunicolor G.M.Gates & Noordel.
- Entoloma cystidiosum G.M.Gates and Noordel.
- Entoloma griseosquamulosum G.M.Gates and Noordel.
- Entoloma mathinnae G.M.Gates, B.M.Horton & Noordel.
- Entoloma melanophtalmum G.M.Gates and Noordel.
- Entoloma natalis-domini G.M.Gates and Noordel.
- Entoloma psilocyboides G.M.Gates and Noordel.
- Entoloma strigosum G.M.Gates and Noordel.
- Entoloma tenuicystidiatum G.M.Gates and Noordel.
- Entoloma totialbum G.M.Gates and Noordel.
- Entoloma transmutans G.M.Gates and Noordel.
- Entoloma violascens G.M.Gates and Noordel.

She also collected the type specimen of Thaxterogaster austrovaginatus. The standard author abbreviation G.M.Gates is used to indicate this person as the author when citing a botanical name.

The specimens collected by Gates in Tasmania are held in herbarium collections around the world.This includes over 2,000 specimens held by the Tasmanian Herbarium, over 4,000 specimens held by the National Herbarium of Victoria, Royal Botanic Gardens Victoria. Outside of Australia, a smaller number are held by the Tartu University Herbarium, and elsewhere.

== Honours, and awards ==
Gates has the following species named after her:

- Lactarius genevieveae D. Stubbe & Verbeken (now Lactifluus genevieveae)
- Allotrechispora gatesiae L.W. Zhou, S.L. Liu & T.W. May
- Fomitiporia gatesiae Y.C. Dai & F. Wu [as 'gatesii']
- Entoloma gatesianum Karstedt & Capelari
- Hydnellum gatesiae J.K. Douch, L.J. Vaughan & T.W. May

After joining the Tasmanian Field Naturalists Club in the 1990s, and in recognition of many years of continuous service to the organisation, Gates was subsequently awarded a lifetime membership to the club in March 2021. Gates was also awarded the Australian Natural History Medallion by the Field Naturalists Club of Victoria in 2022. In 2023, she was inducted into the Tasmanian Honour Roll of Women for service to education and training, the environment, and science and research.
