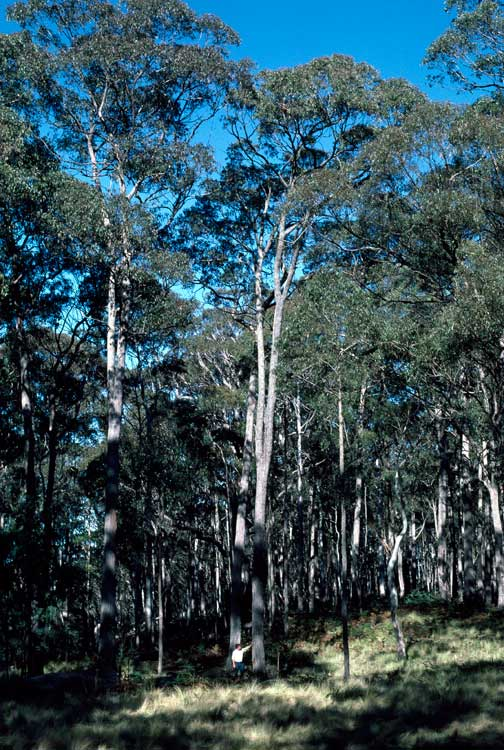
- Silver top stringybark on the Liverpool Range

Conservation status
- Near Threatened (IUCN 3.1)

Scientific classification
- Kingdom: Plantae
- Clade: Tracheophytes
- Clade: Angiosperms
- Clade: Eudicots
- Clade: Rosids
- Order: Myrtales
- Family: Myrtaceae
- Genus: Eucalyptus
- Species: E. laevopinea

Binomial name
- Eucalyptus laevopinea R.T.Baker

= Eucalyptus laevopinea =

Silver top stringybark

Species of eucalyptus

Eucalyptus laevopinea, commonly known as the silver top stringybark, is a tree that is endemic to eastern Australia. It has rough, stringy greyish bark on the trunk and larger branches, glossy green, lance-shaped adult leaves, flower buds in groups of between seven and eleven, white flowers and hemispherical or shortened spherical fruit.

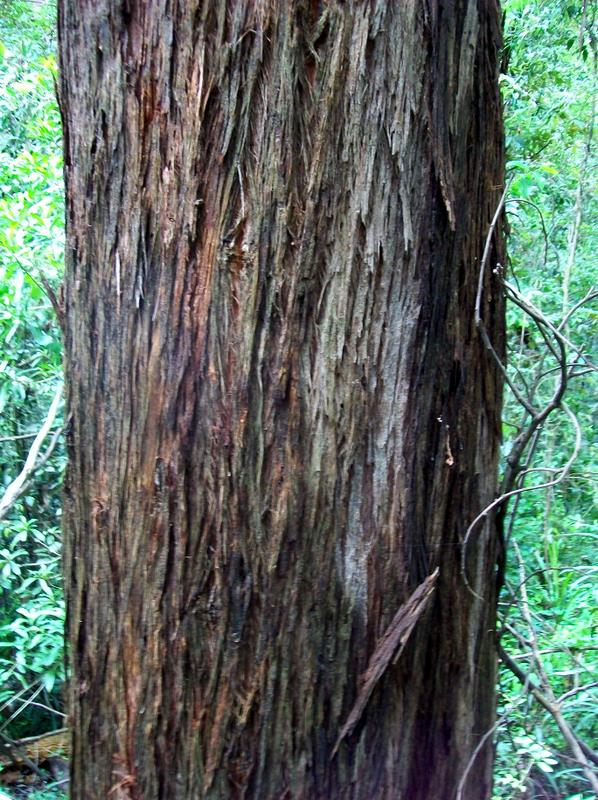
Bark

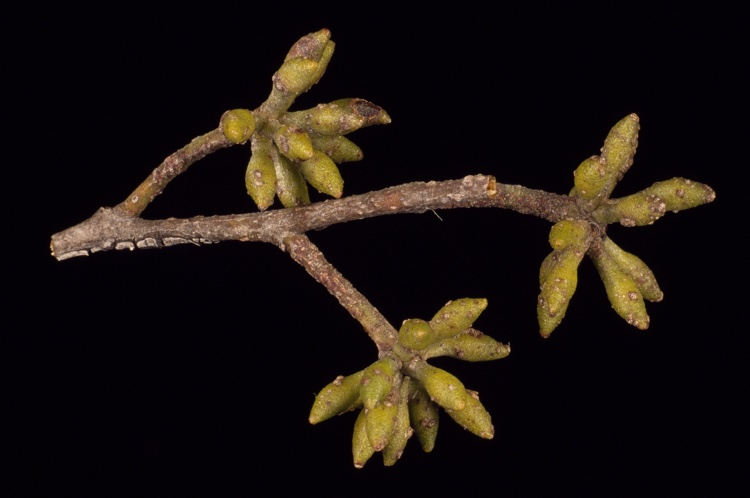
Buds

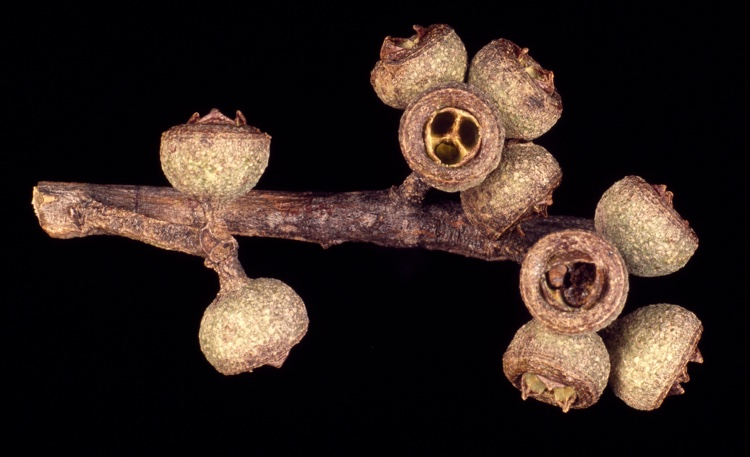
Fruit

== Description ==
Eucalyptus laevopinea is a tree that typically grows to a height of 40 m (130 ft) and forms a lignotuber. It has rough, thick, stringy, greyish bark on the trunk and larger branches, smooth whitish bark above. Young plants and coppice regrowth have lance-shaped to egg-shaped leaves that are paler on the lower surface, 30–120 mm (1.2–4.7 in) long and 10–40 mm (0.39–1.57 in) wide. Adult leaves are lance-shaped to curved, the same shade of glossy green on both sides, 70–200 mm (2.8–7.9 in) long and 14–40 mm (0.55–1.57 in) wide on a petiole 10–23 mm (0.39–0.91 in) long. The flower buds are arranged in leaf axils in groups of seven, nine or eleven on an unbranched peduncle 6–17 mm (0.24–0.67 in) long, the individual buds on pedicels 2–5 mm (0.079–0.197 in) long. Mature buds are oval, 5–7 mm (0.20–0.28 in) long and about 4 mm (0.16 in) wide with a rounded, conical or beaked operculum. Flowering occurs between January and April or between July and September and the flowers are white. The fruit is a woody hemispherical or shortened spherical capsule 4–9 mm (0.16–0.35 in) long and 7–15 mm (0.28–0.59 in) wide with the valves near rim level or slightly protruding.

== Taxonomy and naming ==
Eucalyptus laevopinea was first described in 1898 by Richard Thomas Baker in Proceedings of the Linnean Society of New South Wales. The specific epithet (laevopinea) is derived from the Latin laevo- meaning 'left' and pinene, an essential oil, referring to the levorotatory pinene.

== Distribution and habitat ==
The silver top stringybark occurs between the Rylstone district in New South Wales to the Warwick and Stanthorpe districts in southern Queensland. It grows in hilly areas of the tablelands in open forest.

== Conservation status ==
The IUCN Red List assesses the species as Near Threatened.
