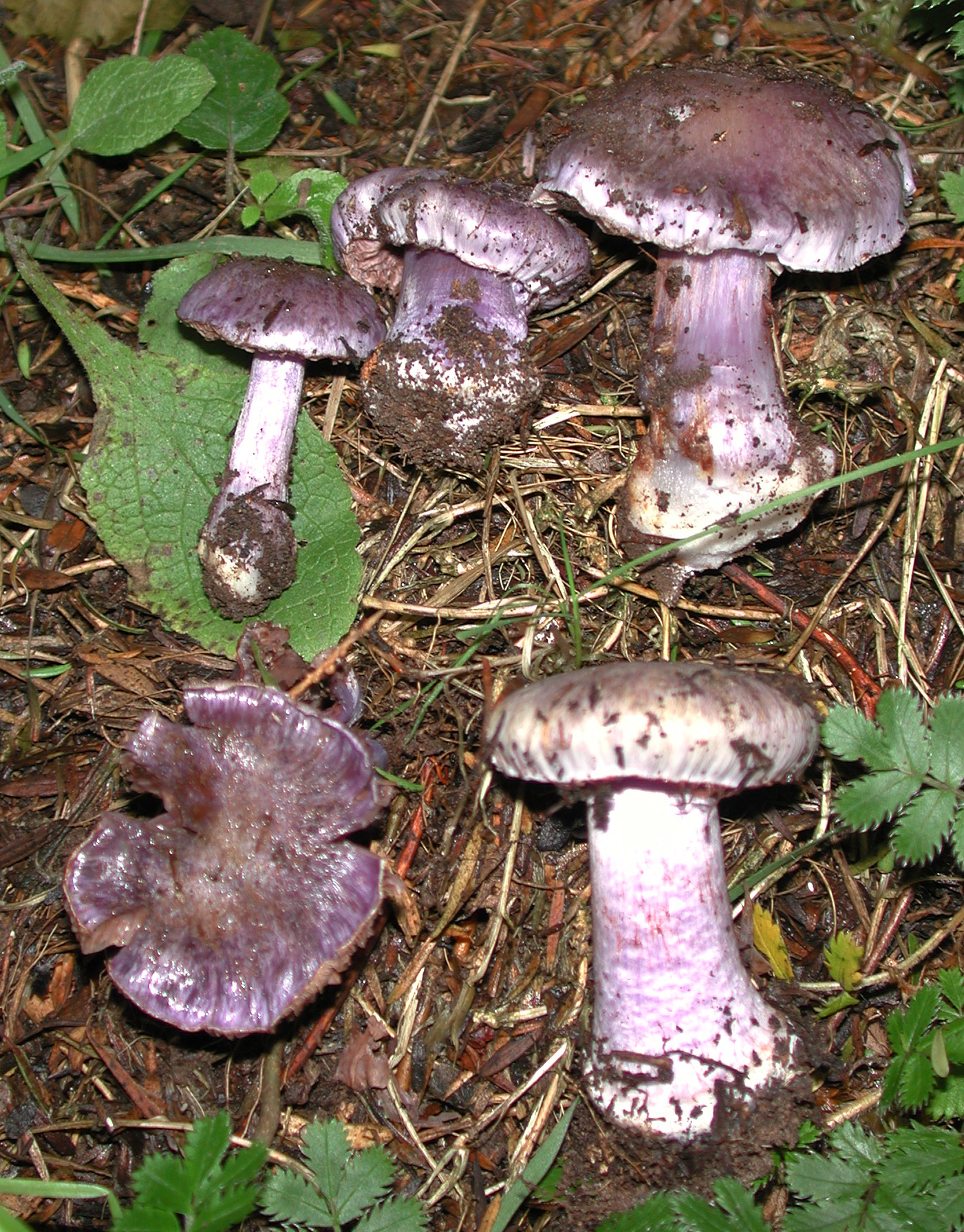

Scientific classification
- Kingdom: Fungi
- Division: Basidiomycota
- Class: Agaricomycetes
- Order: Agaricales
- Family: Cortinariaceae
- Genus: Thaxterogaster
- Species: T. austrovaginatus

Binomial name
- Thaxterogaster austrovaginatus (Gasparini) Niskanen & Liimat. (2022)

Synonyms
- Cortinarius austrovaginatus Gasparini (2007)

= Thaxterogaster austrovaginatus =

Species of fungus

Thaxterogaster austrovaginatus is a species of ectomycorrhizal fungus in the family Cortinariaceae.

== Taxonomy ==
It was originally described by Bruno Gasparini in 2007 and classified as Cortinarius austrovaginatus based on a holotype specimen collected by mycologist Genevieve Gates at Jackson's Bend, Mt Wellington, Tasmania, Australia. The species also occurs in New Zealand, where it is reported to have a semi-secotioid habit. Cortinarius austrovaginatus is in Section Austrovaginati, along with two New Zealand species C. coneae and C. medioscaurus. This Section is of interest because it contains an agaricoid (C. medioscaurus), semi-secotioid (C. austrovaginatus) and a secotioid (C. coneae) species.

In 2022 the species was transferred from Cortinarius to Thaxterogaster austrovaginatus based on genomic data.

== Description ==
The pileus of Thaxterogaster austrovaginatus is up to 60 mm in diameter, with a viscid cuticle, fibrillose, the colour ranges from brown/vinaceous to pale lilac-brown with buff margin, and the cap has remnants of the white veil stained with the rusty spores. The lamellae are close, moderately thick, adnate, livid vinaceous when young and lilac brown at maturity. The gill margin is heterogeneous, whitish irregular and crenulated. The stipe is 30–36 mm tall and 8–12 mm wide, robust, fibrillose, cylindrical, lilac to livid vinaceous, with heavy rusty chocolate-brown spore deposit, densely covered with velar remains. The bulb is marginate, ampullaceous to slightly turbinate, violet, but covered with a white sheath of the universal veil forming a volva. The universal veil is white and submembranaceous. The cortina is white, abundant and permanent. The cap tissue does not react to the application of alkali solutions.

== Habitat and distribution ==
The species was described from Nothofagus forests in Tasmania. In New Zealand it has myrtaceous hosts.

== Etymology ==
The specific epithet austrovaginatus is derived from the Latin austro, meaning from the south, and vaginatus, meaning sheathed, and it refers to this species being a southern species similar in appearance to the South American species, Cortinarius vaginatus.

== See also ==
- List of Cortinarius species
