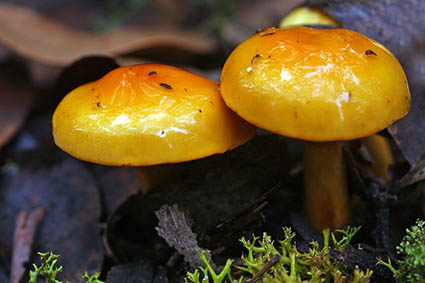

Scientific classification
- Domain: Eukaryota
- Kingdom: Fungi
- Division: Basidiomycota
- Class: Agaricomycetes
- Order: Agaricales
- Family: Cortinariaceae
- Genus: Cortinarius
- Species: C. sinapicolor

Binomial name
- Cortinarius sinapicolor Cleland, 1933

= Cortinarius sinapicolor =

Species of fungus

Cortinarius sinapicolor is a species of fungus in the family Cortinariaceae native to Australia.
