= Gymnopilus subspectabilis =

Scientific classification
- Kingdom: Fungi
- Division: Basidiomycota
- Class: Agaricomycetes
- Order: Agaricales
- Family: Hymenogastraceae
- Genus: Gymnopilus
- Species: G. subspectabilis

Binomial name
- Gymnopilus subspectabilis Hesler

Species of fungus

Gymnopilus subspectabilis
- Mycological characteristics
- Gills on hymenium
- Cap is convex
- Hymenium is adnexed or adnate
- Ecology is saprotrophic
- Edibility is psychoactive

Gymnopilus subspectabilis, commonly known as the big laughing mushroom, laughing gym, or giant gymnopilus, is a species of agaric fungi in the family Hymenogastraceae, which also includes the hallucinogenic drug psilocybin.

== See also ==
- List of Gymnopilus species
