= Annulus (mycology) =

Ring on mushroom stipe

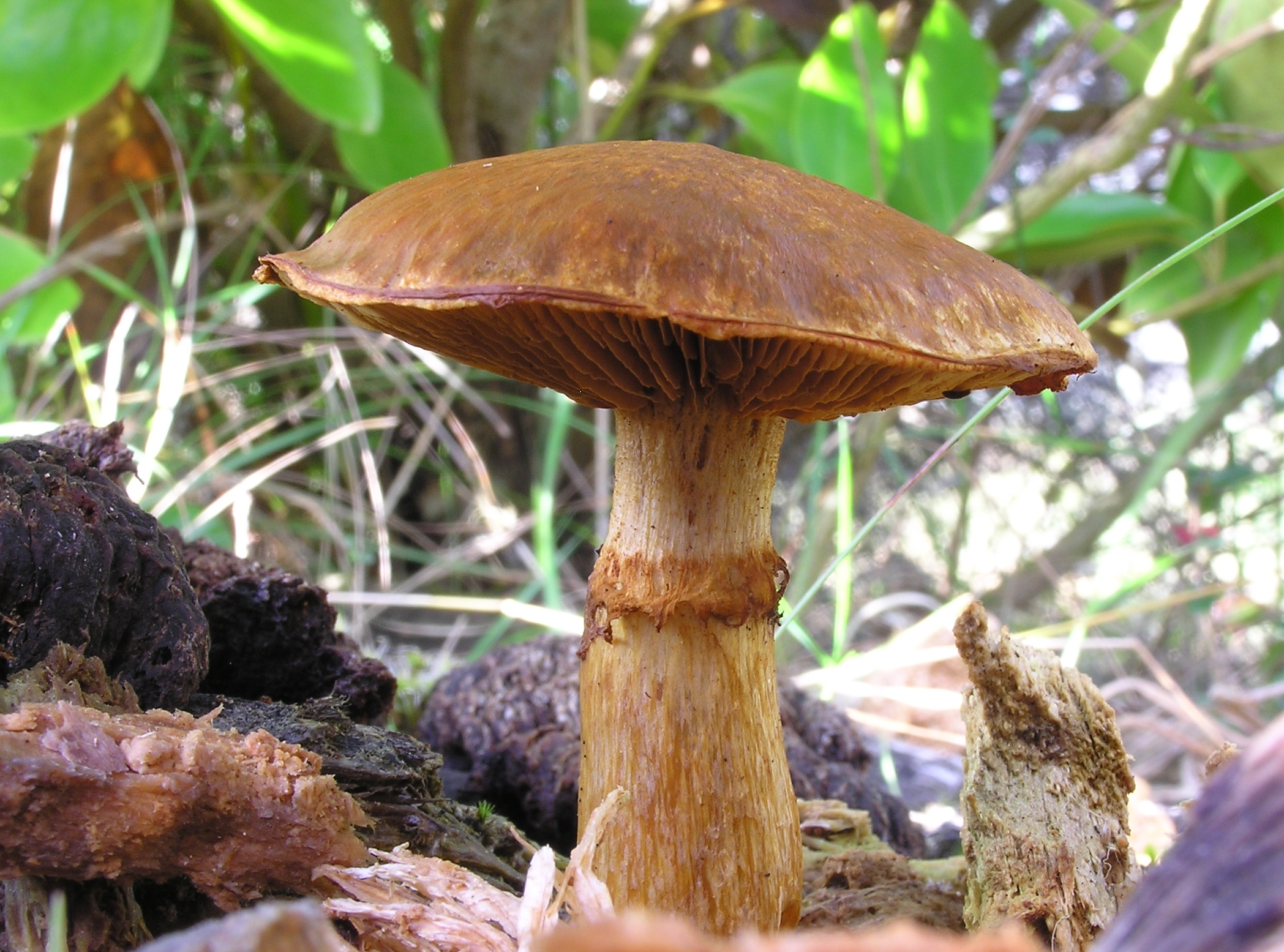
A ring can be seen on the stem of this Gymnopilus junonius mushroom.

An annulus is the ring-like or collar-like structure sometimes found on the stipe of some species of mushrooms. The annulus represents the remnants of the partial veil, after it has ruptured to expose the gills or other spore-producing surface. It can also be called a ring which is what the Latin word annulus directly translates as. The modern usage of the Latin word originates from the early days of botany and mycology when species descriptions were only written in Latin. Outside of the formal setting of scientific publications which still have a Latin requirement, it will often just be referred to as a ring or stem ring in field guides and on identification websites.

== Ring descriptions ==
The way in which the structure and appearance of rings is described can vary with author and the description may only note the existence of a ring without providing specific information in cases where the ring lacks any notable features that would be useful to distinguish between similar species. Ring shapes and structures can also vary between specimens of the same species and change with the age of the mushroom so multiple descriptions are sometimes used. Even in species with distinctly identifiable rings they may not always be present or perfectly match descriptions so it can be beneficial to have multiple specimens to compare at different states of maturity.

Some rings may be persistent and remain through the life of the mushroom or they may disappear with age. Such rings have a variety of synonymous terms associated with them such as fleeting, ephemeral, evanescent, transient, fugacious or impermanent. These rings may peel away from the stem, fall apart or simply fade into the stem surface as it matures. Rings may also be described as fragile, meaning easily torn or damaged and whilst some fragile rings could be considered permanent if undisturbed they are often likely to vanish due to their fragility. Some rings may be fixed in place and firmly attached to the stem whilst others may be movable or mobile with the ability to slide up and down the stem either by hand or just falling down naturally with age. Fragile and movable rings can appear to vanish so examining the stem for traces of a ring zone (or annular zone) or the base for a detached ring can sometimes be helpful. Various combinations of these terms can be used to best describe the nature of the ring in a particular species.

Some common descriptions of the type of ring include:

- Ringless - a stem which has no ring.
- Double - a ring with a distinct upper and lower surface.
- Flaring - a ring which flairs upwards and away from the stem, sometimes also called ascending.
- Pendant - a hanging or skirt like partial veil.
- Peronate - a sheathed stem which may resemble a stocking that covers the full length.
- Cortinate - a fibrous, cobweb like cortina, especially notable in some Cortinarius species.
- Ring zone - an area on the stem where only traces of the ring remain, sometimes becoming visible due to spore staining.
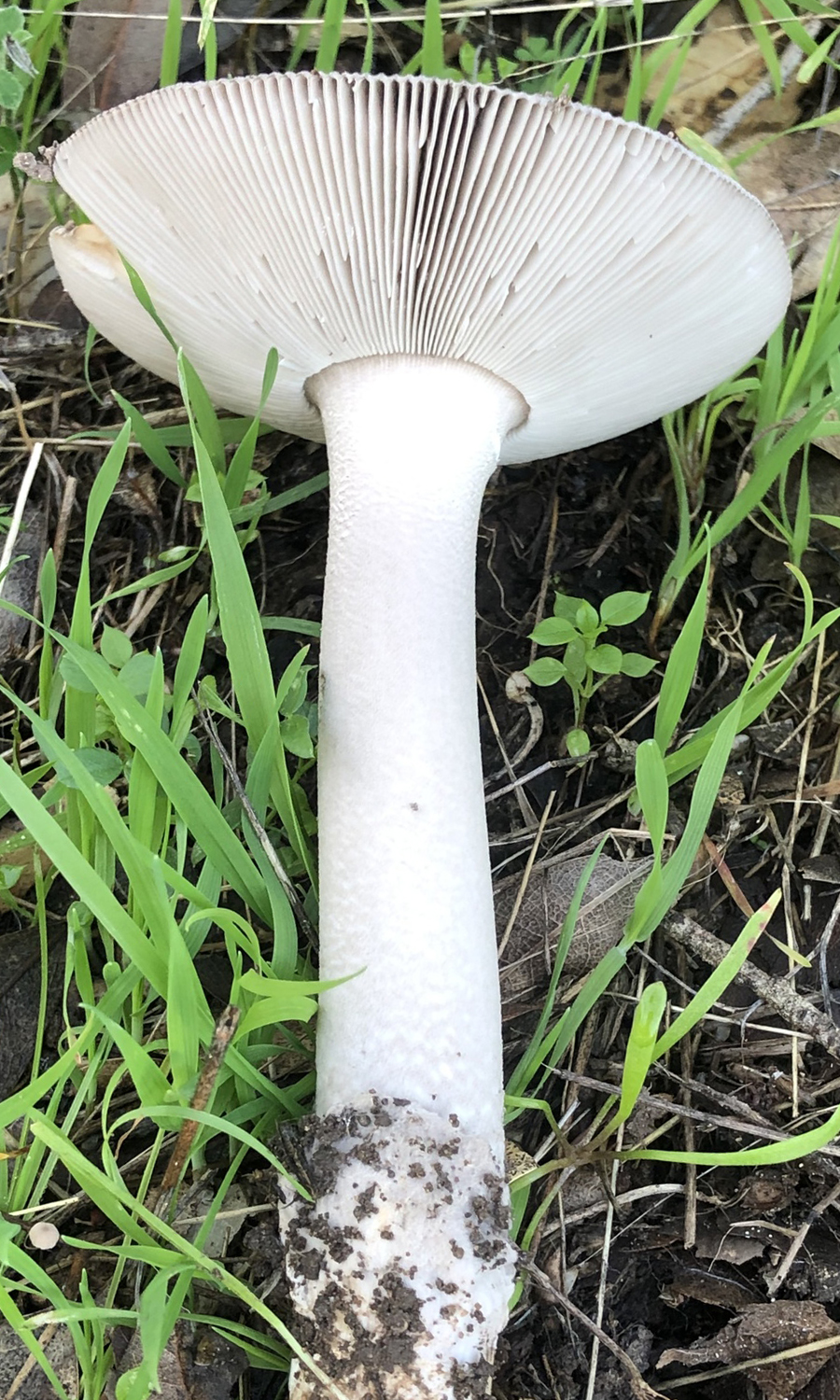
Ringless stem of Amanita vaginata

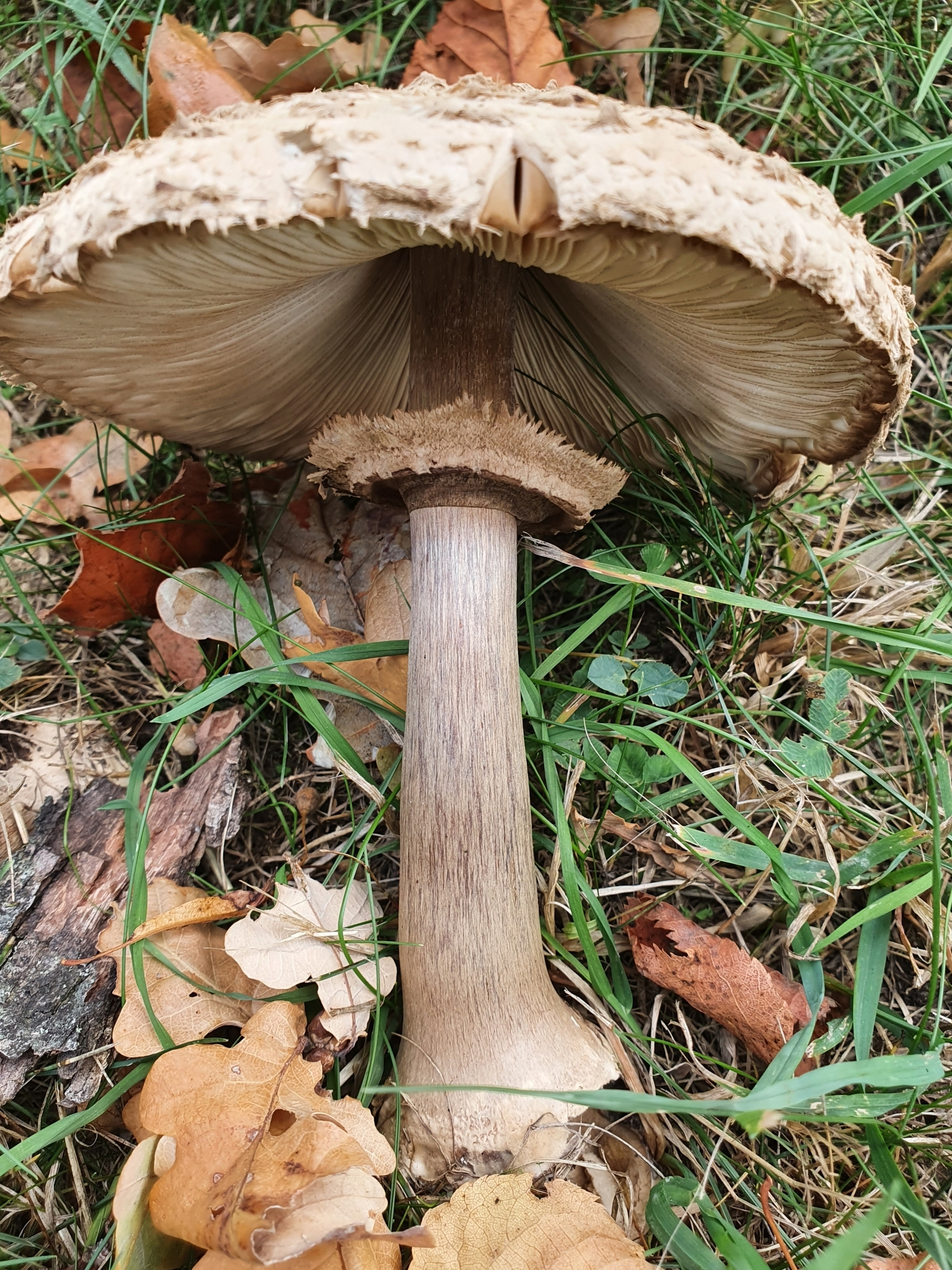
Double ring of Chlorophyllum rhacodes

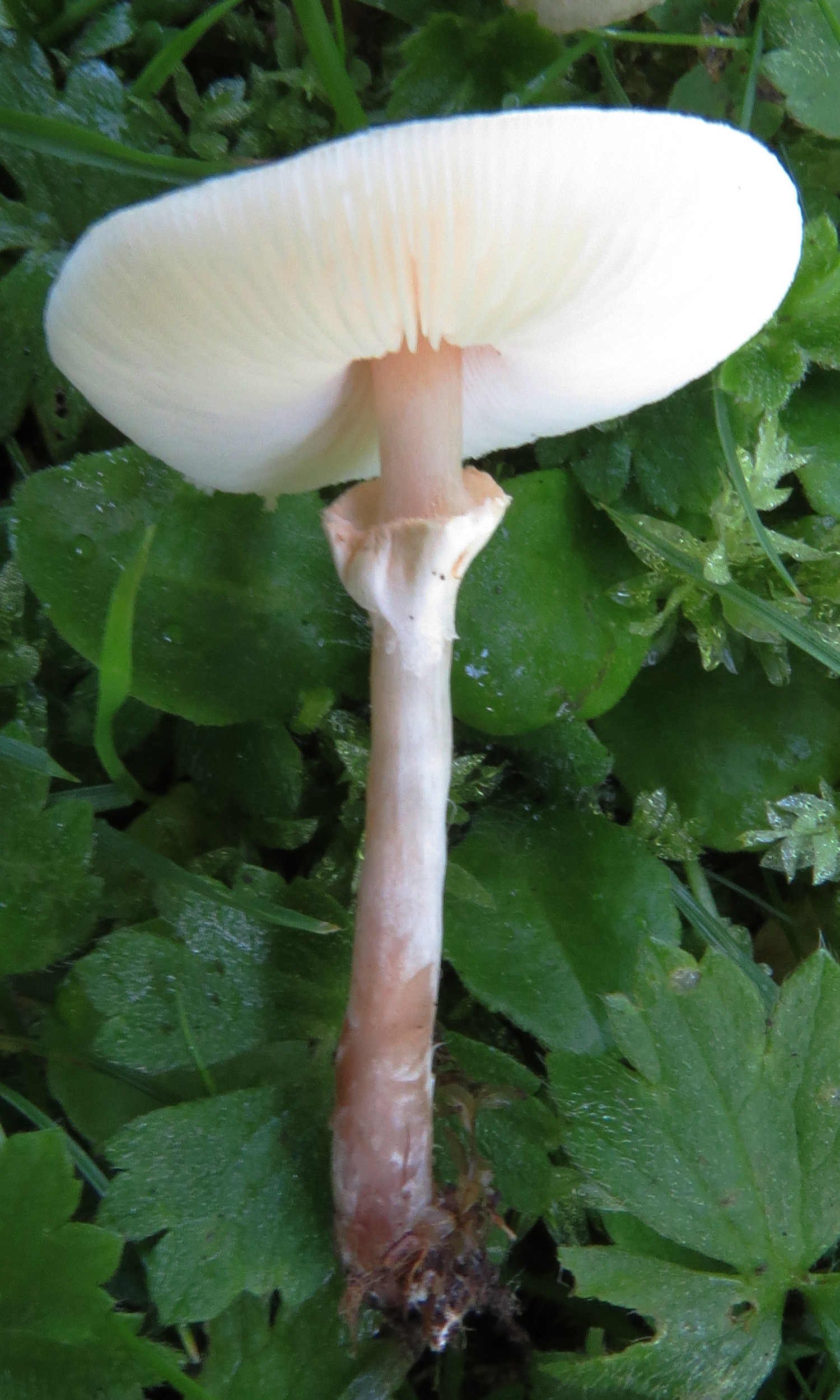
Flaring stem ring

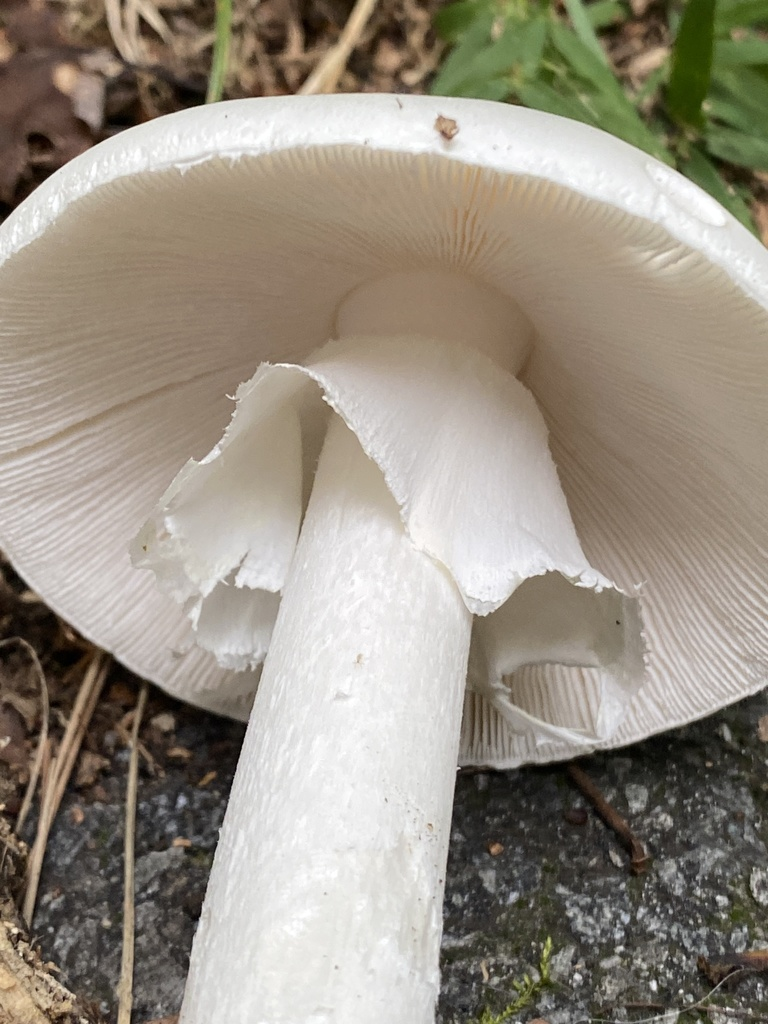
Pendant veil of Amanita bisporigera

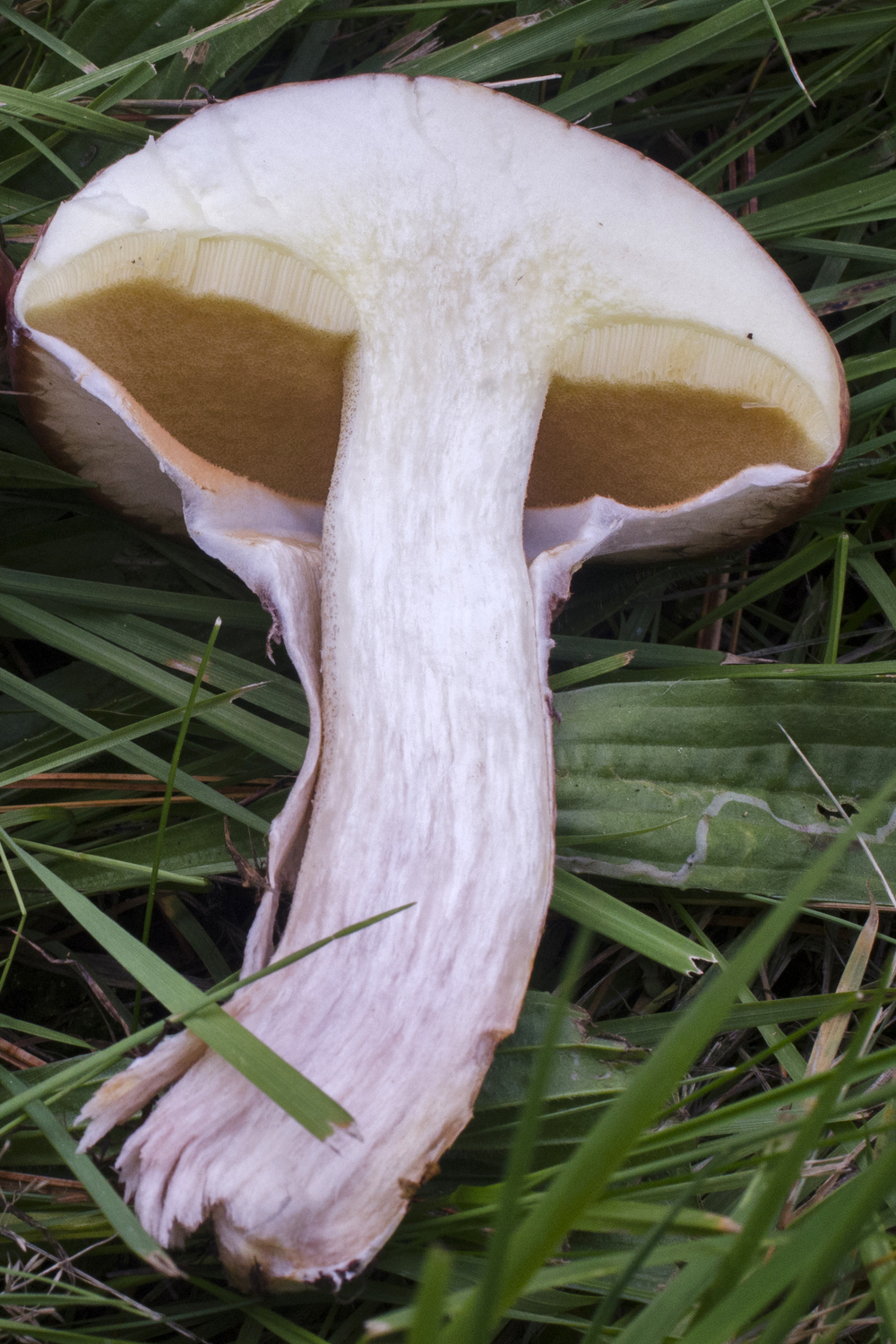
Peronate or sheathed stem of Suillus luteus (cross section)

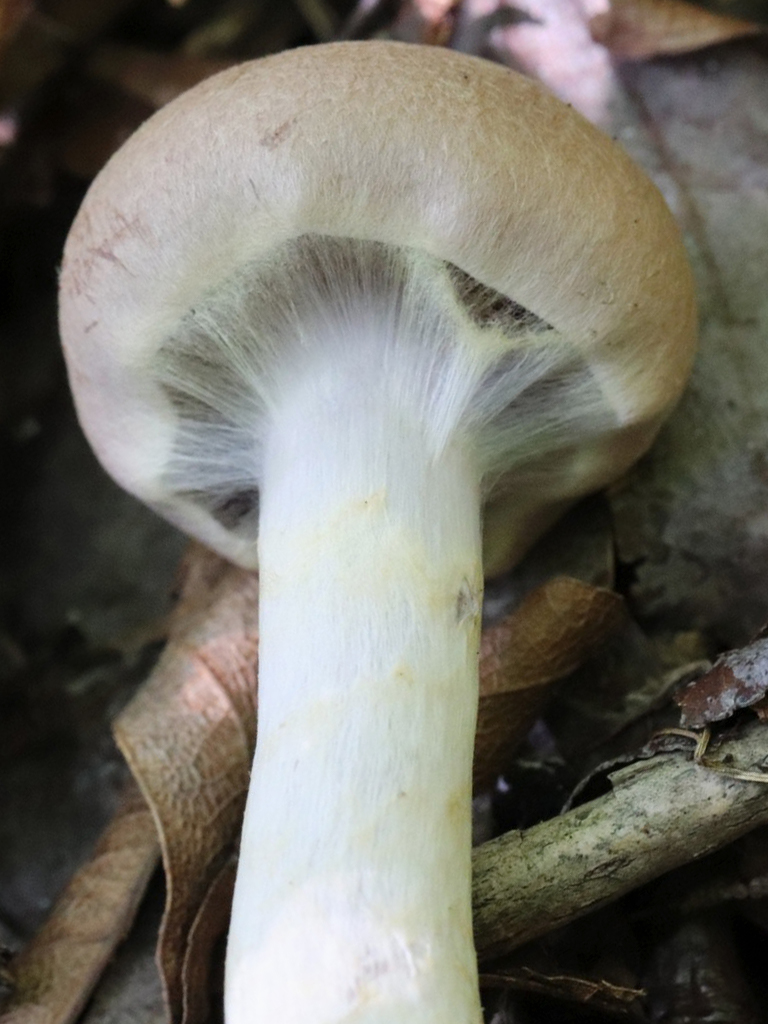
Cortina of a Cortinarius species

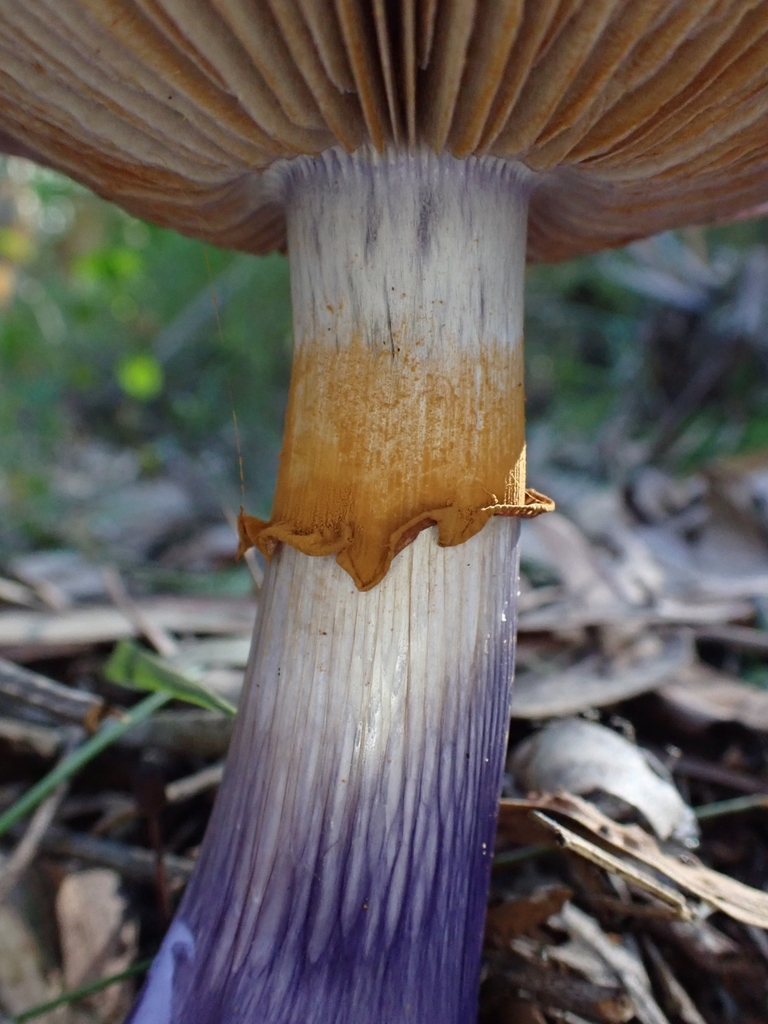
Ring zone of Cortinarius archeri stained by spores

=== Texture/Flesh ===
The texture of the partial veil can exhibit specific characteristics which can aid in identification and these may persist in the ring once the cap has detached from it. These details may be similar to that of the cap surface or distinct from it.

Texture/surface descriptions include:

- Thick - a ring with thick, often sturdy flesh.
- Membranous - a thin fleshed, often diminutive ring.
- Stellate - a star or cogwheel shaped veil.
- Floccose - a woolly or scaly veil, often resembling the texture of the cap.
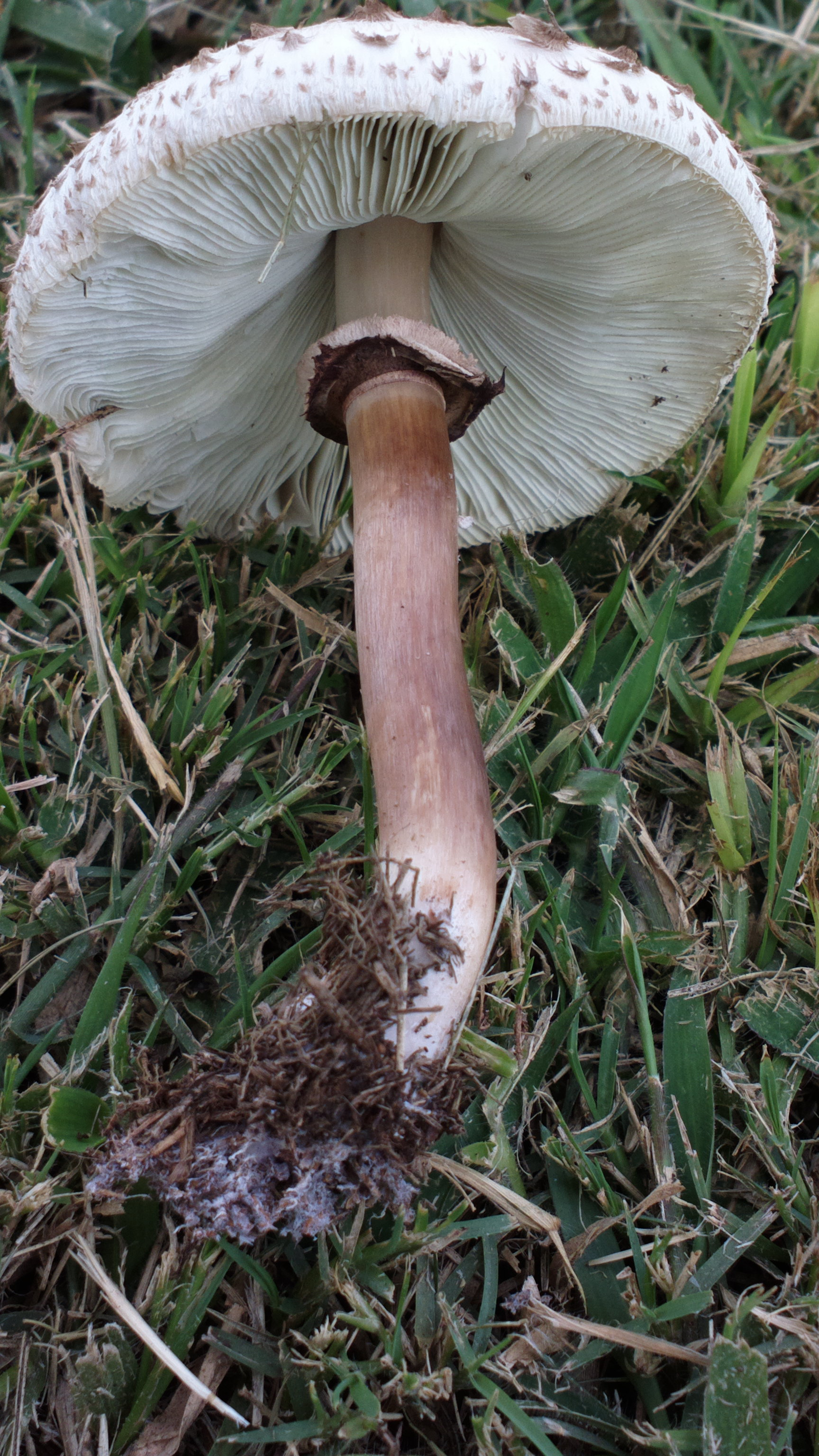
Thick ring of a Chlorophyllum species

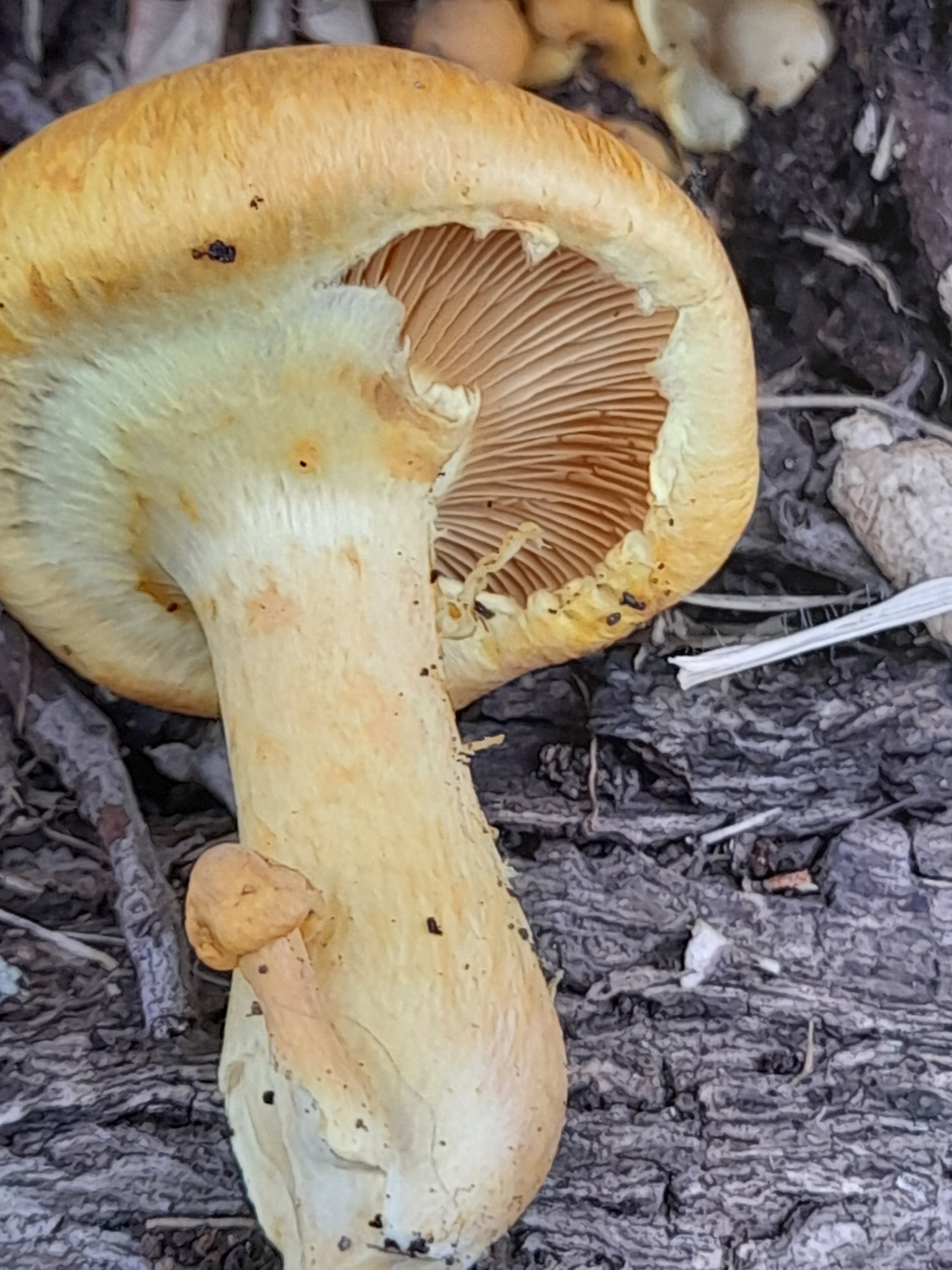
Membranous partial veil of Gymnopilus junonius

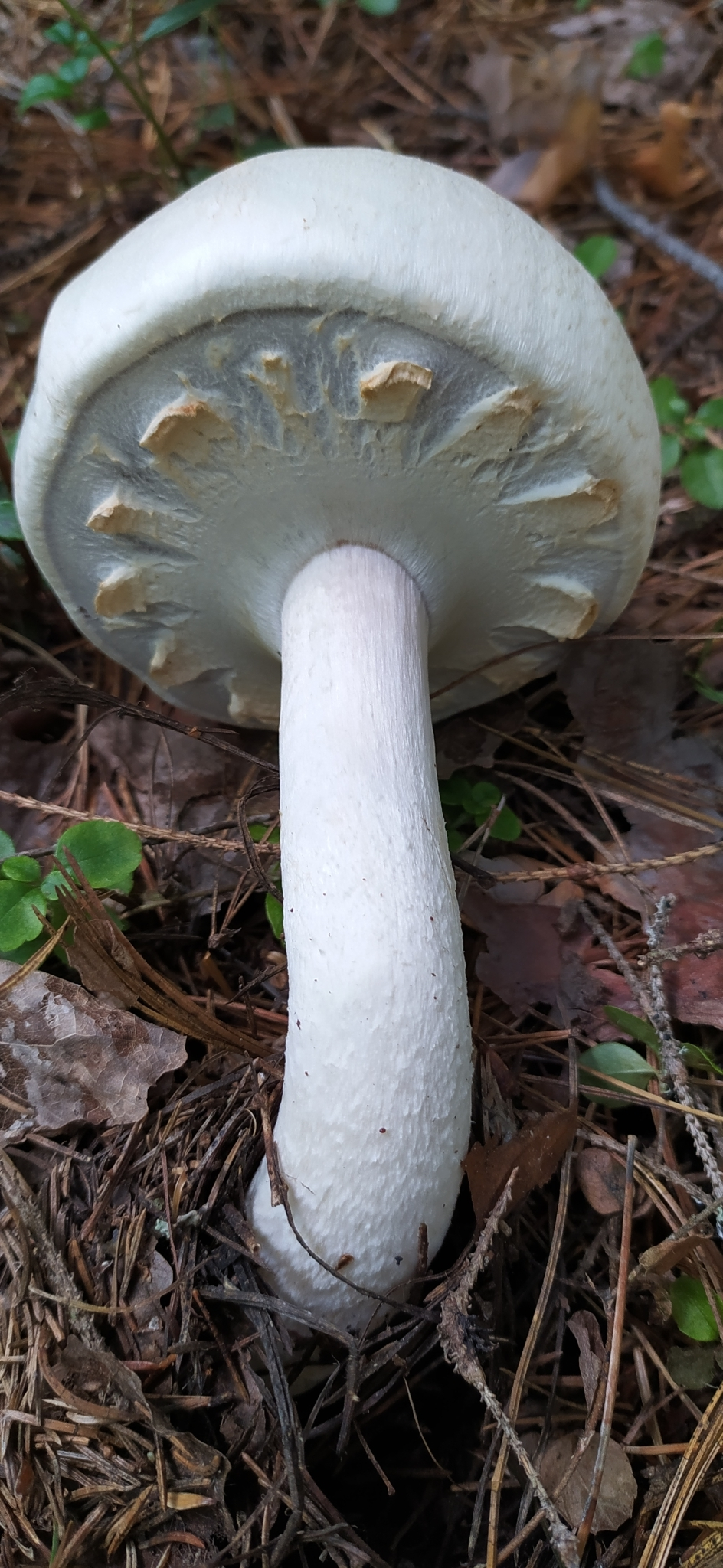
Stellate or cogweel veil on an Agaricus species

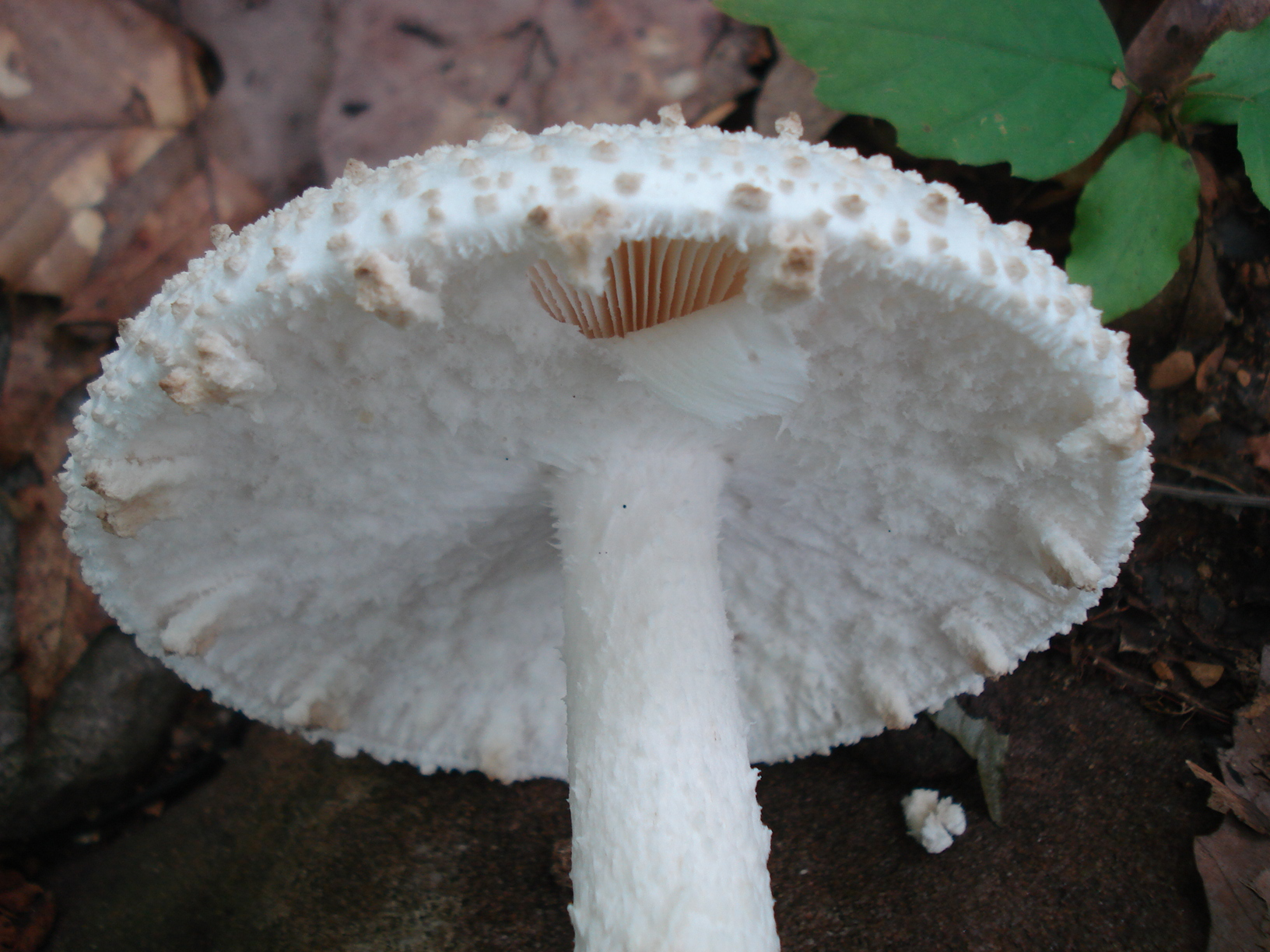
Floccose veil on an Amanita species

=== Ring positions ===
The position of the ring can be an important factor to observe to aid in identification although it is often not included in descriptions as for some species it can be quite variable. The position may appear different from specimen to specimen due to the height of the stem or the age of the mushroom and in species with movable, fragile or otherwise detachable rings it may not always be a reliable factor to observe. However for species which otherwise look quite similar but exhibit differences in colouration, texture or staining above or below the stem ring, the position can be a useful factor to note.

The common descriptions of positions are:

- Superior - Near the top of the stem.
- Apical - Above the middle of the stem.
- Median - In the middle of the stem.
- Inferior - Below the middle of the stem.
- Basal - Near the base of the stem.
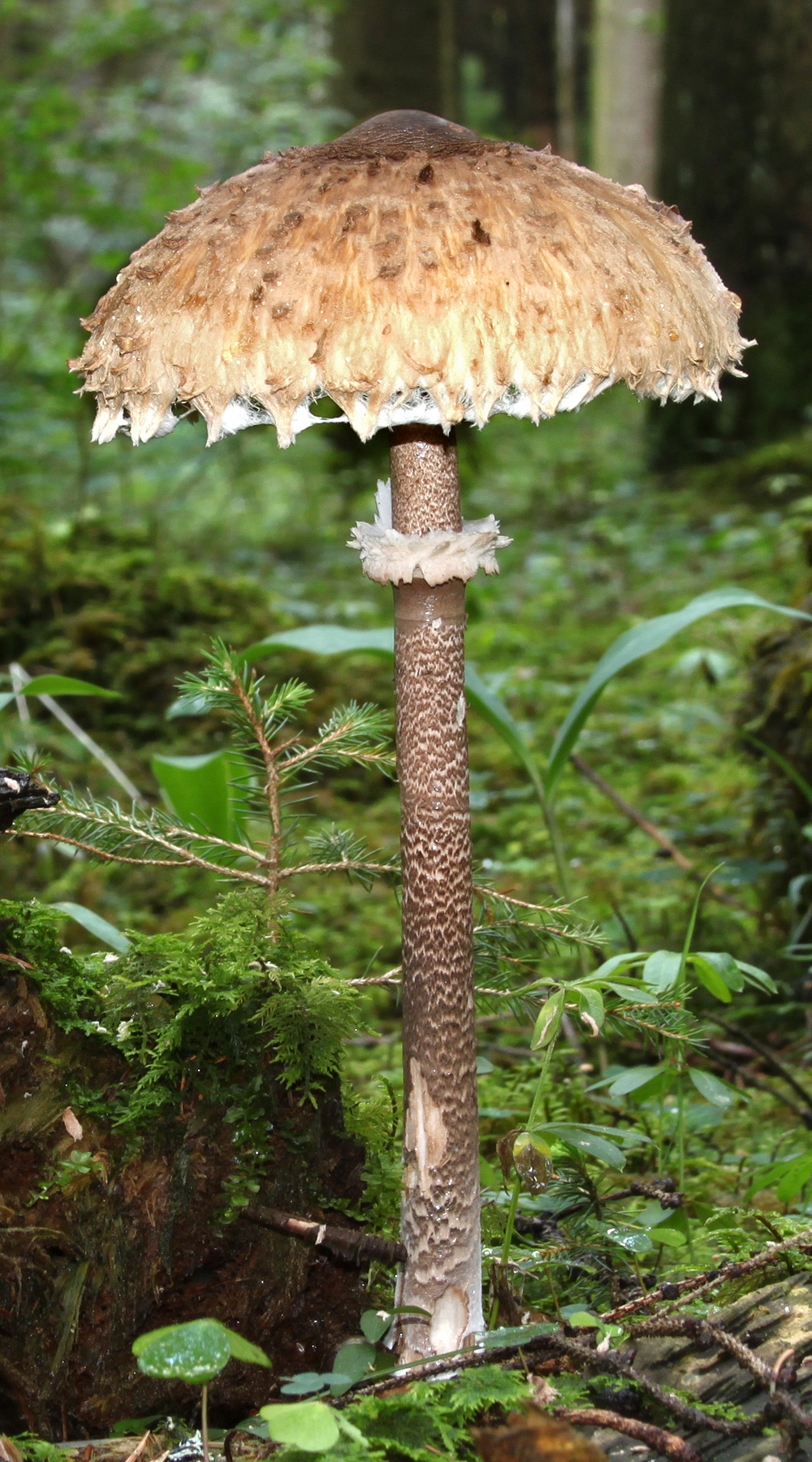
Superior, double ring of a Macrolepiota species

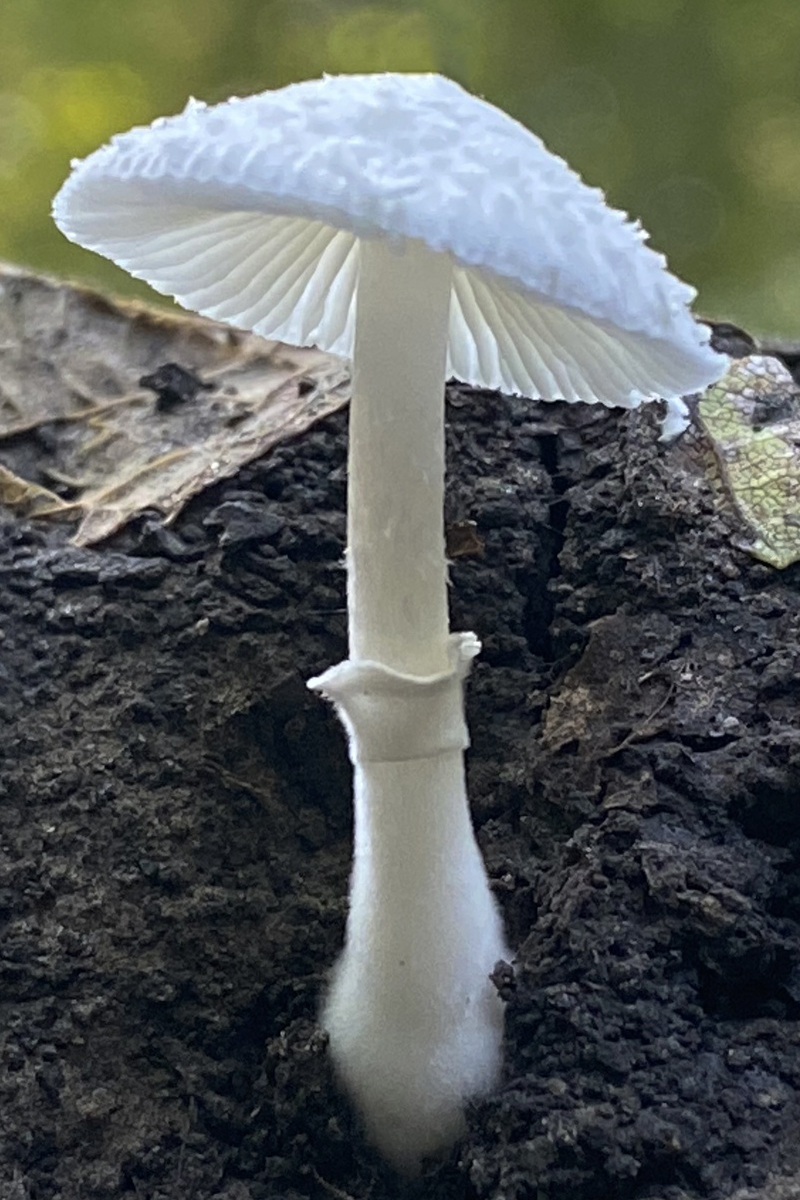
Inferior, flared ring of a Leucocoprinus species

== See also ==
- Volva
