= Machiel Noordeloos =

Dutch mycologist

- Born: 16 April 1949 (age 77); The Hague, Netherlands
- Known for: Contributions to taxonomic mycology
- Scientific career
- Fields: Mycology
- Workplaces: Nationaal Herbarium Nederland
- Author abbrev. (botany): Noordel.

Machiel Evert Noordeloos (born 16 April 1949) is a Dutch mycologist. He is known for his contributions to the taxonomy of European mushrooms and especially his expertise on the genus Entoloma. Noordeloos is an assistant professor at the Nationaal Herbarium Nederland, and has served as the editor of the mycological journals Persoonia since 1991 and Coolia since 1976. He was in 2011 the editor in chief of Persoonia. He was the recipient of the Clusius Prize awarded by the Hungarian Mycological Society in 2009.

== Eponymous taxa ==
- Entoloma noordeloosi Hauskn.
- Entoloma machieli A. De Meijer

== See also ==
- Category:Taxa named by Machiel Noordeloos
