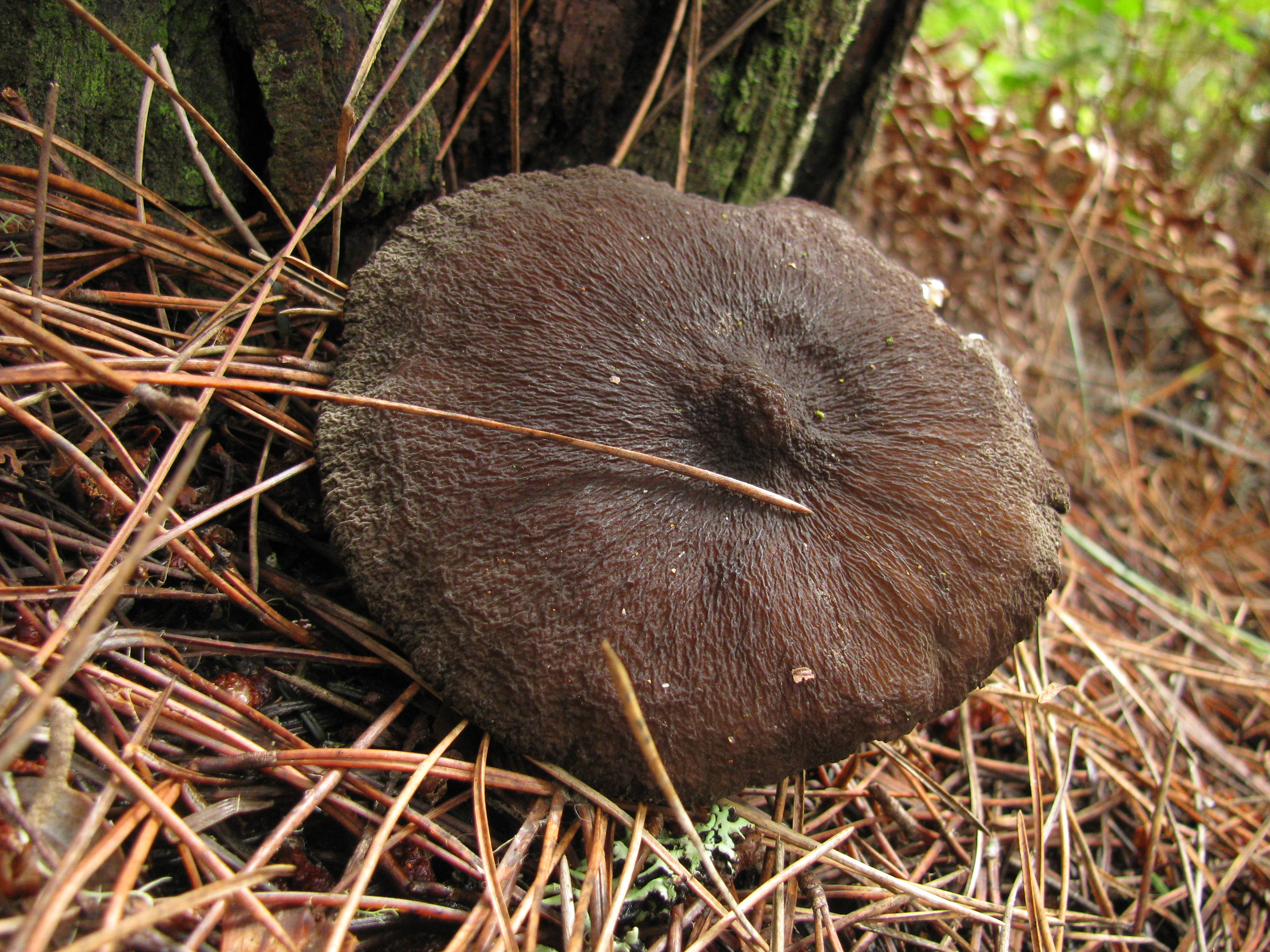

Scientific classification
- Kingdom: Fungi
- Division: Basidiomycota
- Class: Agaricomycetes
- Order: Russulales
- Family: Russulaceae
- Genus: Lactarius
- Species: L. fallax

Binomial name
- Lactarius fallax A.H.Sm. & Hesler (1962)

Synonyms
- Lactarius picinus var. maritimus A.H.Sm. & Hesler (1962)

= Lactarius fallax =

Species of fungus

Lactarius fallax
- Mycological characteristics
- Gills on hymenium
- Cap is depressed
- Hymenium is decurrent
- Stipe is bare
- Spore print is cream to yellow
- Ecology is mycorrhizal
- Edibility is unknown

Lactarius fallax, commonly known as the velvety milk cap, is a species of fungus in the family Russulaceae.

Its fruit bodies are medium-sized, with velvety, brown to blackish caps up to 2–9 cm (0.79–3.54 in) in diameter bearing a distinct pointed umbo. The caps are supported by velvety stems up to 8 cm (3.1 in) long and 1.5 cm (0.6 in) thick. The mushroom oozes a whitish latex when it is cut, and injured tissue eventually turns a dull reddish color. The eastern North American and European species L. lignyotus is closely similar in appearance, but can be distinguished by its differing range.

Found in both spruce and mixed conifer forests, L. fallax is a fairly common species in the Pacific Northwest region of North America, with a northerly range extending to Alaska.

== Taxonomy ==
The species was originally described by American mycologists Alexander H. Smith and Lexemuel Ray Hesler in a 1962 publication. Smith made the initial collection in late October 1944, in Rhododendron, Oregon. The publication also described the variety Lactarius fallax var. concolor based on specimens collected in Mount Hood. According to Smith and Hesler, this variety had been to that point generally identified as Lactarius lignyotus in the Pacific Northwest. They described the variety L. lignyotus var. americanus to account for differences such as "spore ornamentation, distant gills at maturity, and the typically slightly acrid taste". However, in their 1979 monograph of North American Lactarius species, they considered L. lignyotus var. americanus to be equivalent (and thus synonymous) to L. fallax var. concolor. The specific epithet fallax is derived from the Latin word "deceptive". The mushroom is commonly known as the "velvety milk cap".

Lactarius fallax is classified in the section Plinthogalus of the subgenus Plinthogalus of the genus Lactarius. Species in this section have brown to blackish caps, and a cap cuticle that contains a dissolved brown pigment. The cuticle of most species is of the trichoderm type—where the outermost hyphae emerge roughly parallel, like hairs, perpendicular to the cap surface.

== Description ==
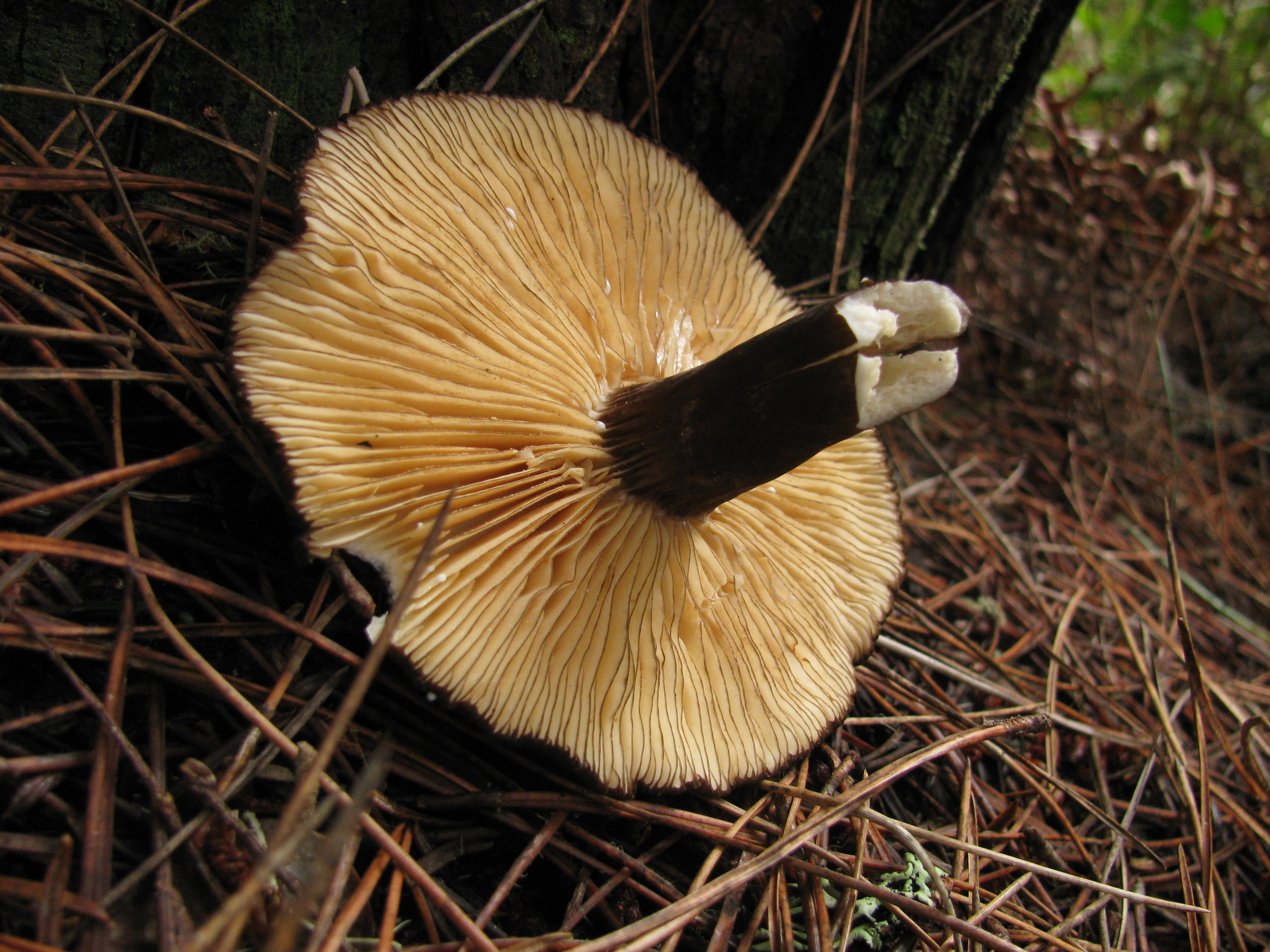
In L. fallax var. fallax, the gill edges are brown, similar in color to the cap.

The cap of L. fallax is 2–9 cm (0.79–3.54 in) wide, ranging in shape from convex to nearly flat with a small umbo, expanding to plane or becoming shallowly depressed, with or without the umbo. The margin (cap edge) is even or scalloped. The cap surface is dry and velvety, finely wrinkled over the center, azonate (without concentric lines), and dark sooty brown to blackish. The gills are attached to subdecurrent (running shortly down the length of the stem), narrow, crowded, not forked, white at first, and become creamy buff with age. The edges of the gills are brown like the cap, and slowly stain vinaceous (redwine-colored) when bruised. There are several tiers of lamellulae (short gills that do not reach the stem) interspersed among the full-length gills. The stem is 2.5–8 cm (1.0–3.1 in) long, 5–15 mm (0.2–0.6 in) thick, nearly equal in width throughout, dry, solid, unpolished or velvety, and a paler brown than the cap. The flesh is thin, brittle, staining pale vinaceous. The odor is not distinctive, and the taste mild or faintly acrid. The latex is copious, white on exposure, unchanging, slowly staining flesh and gills vinaceous. The spore print is yellowish-white.

The edibility of the mushroom is unknown. The species is one of several brown to nearly black milkcaps that are, according to David Arora, "notable for their beauty, and therefore likely to attract the attention of even the casual collector".

The variety Lactarius fallax var. concolor is nearly identical to the main species in appearance and distribution, but has gill edges that are colored like the gill face.

=== Microscopic characteristics ===
The spores are spherical, and ornamented with warts and ridges that form a partial reticulum (a net-like pattern of lines) with prominences up to 2 μm high. They are hyaline (translucent), amyloid (meaning they will absorb iodine when stained with Melzer's reagent), and measure 7.5–10.0 by 7–9.5 μm. The cap cuticle is a trichoderm. The basidia (the spore-bearing cells) are 38–56 by 10–13 μm, club-shaped, four-spored, and hyaline when mounted in a dilute solution of potassium hydroxide (KOH). There are abundant cheilocystidia (cystidia found on the edge of gills), with contents ranging in color from dingy yellow to hyaline in KOH. They measure 32–50 by 3-6 μm, and may be shaped somewhat like a spindle (tapered on each end) or a cylinder, or they may be flexuous (winding from side to side). The pleurocystidia (cystidia found on the gill face) are filamentous, 2.5–5 μm in diameter, and rare to scattered.

=== Similar species ===
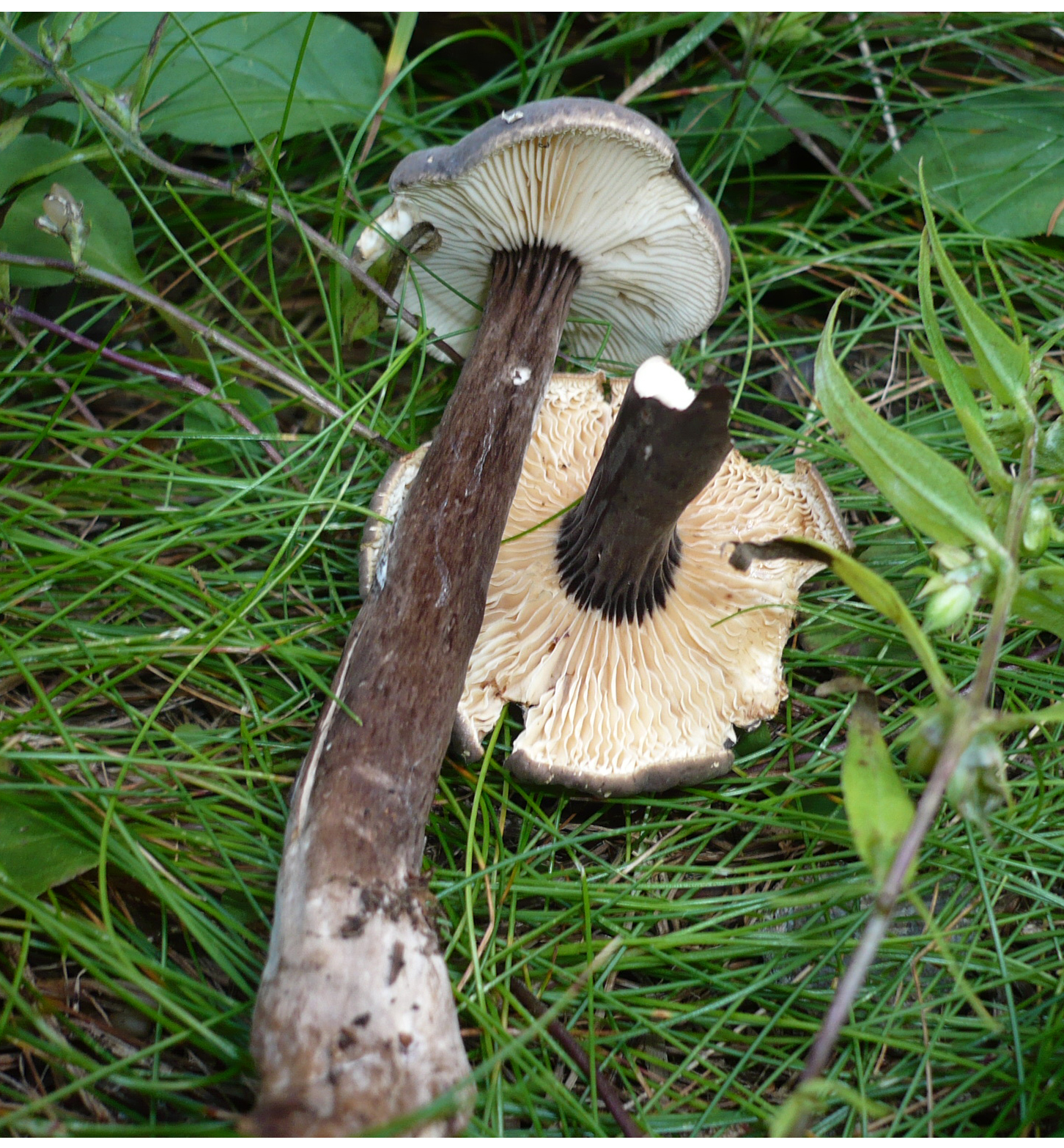
L. lignyotus is a lookalike species found in Europe and eastern North America.

Lactarius lignyotellus and L. lignyotus are similar to L. fallax, and they are all associated with Picea and Abies; examination of microscopic features cannot be used to distinguish between them. L. lignyotus is restricted in distribution to eastern North America and Europe. Lactarius pseudomucidus is another milk cap with a dark brown cap, but it has a smooth (not velvety) and slimy cap and stem. Another brown-capped eastern North American species is L. gerardii; it has distantly spaced white gills that run down the stem. L. fuliginellus, which prefers to grow near hardwoods, has close gills.

== Habitat and distribution ==
The fruit bodies of L. fallax grow scattered to grouped together on the ground, or on very rotten conifer logs in alpine areas under standing conifers. They are also found in spruce forests. They are fairly common, and typically found between August and October. L. fallax is distributed in the western United States and Canada, with the northern range extending to Alaska; the eastern range is bounded on the east by the Great Plains. Field observations suggest that the fungus can form ectomycorrhizal associations with Tsuga heterophylla. Hesler and Smith noted that the variety concolor was prevalent under species of Fir.

== See also ==
- List of Lactarius species
