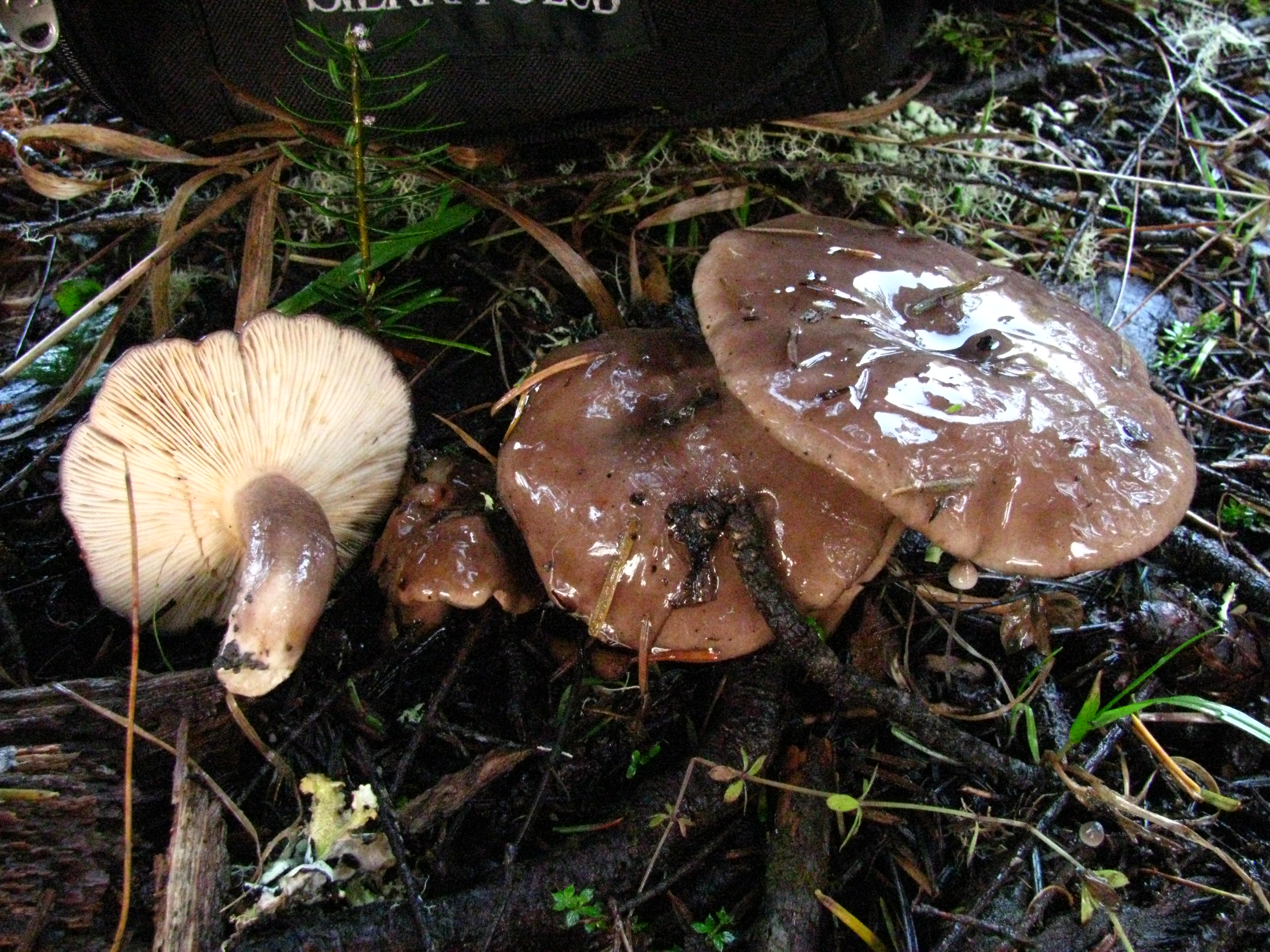
- Lactarius pseudomucidus found in Mendocino, California

Scientific classification
- Kingdom: Fungi
- Division: Basidiomycota
- Class: Agaricomycetes
- Order: Russulales
- Family: Russulaceae
- Genus: Lactarius
- Species: L. pseudomucidus

Binomial name
- Lactarius pseudomucidus A.H.Sm. & Hesler (1979)

= Lactarius pseudomucidus =

Species of fungus

Lactarius pseudomucidus Mycological characteristics
- Gills on hymenium
- Cap is depressed
- Hymenium is decurrent
- Stipe is bare
- Spore print is cream
- Edibility is unknown

Lactarius pseudomucidus, commonly known as the slimy milk cap, is a mucilaginous species of fungus native to North America.

== Description ==
It has a charcoal brown cap, smooth and slimy, from 2–10 centimetres (3/4–4 in) across, initially flat convex, becoming shallowly depressed. The gills are decurrent, white with a gray or yellow tinge, staining brownish. The stipe is 2.5–10 cm (1–4 in) tall and 5–12 millimetres (1/4–1/2 in) thick; it is hollow and brittle. Both the cap and stipe are mucilaginous. The flesh is gray and the latex is milky white, drying yellowish. There is only a slight odor, and the taste slowly becomes acrid. Spores are white in mass, ellipsoid, amyloid, about 8 μm long, with a reticulate decoration on the surface. The spore print is cream.

The species is inedible, with the extremely viscid cap and stalk being deterrent.

=== Similar species ===
It resembles Lactarius argillaceifolius, which has a light orange-gray cap, and eastern North America's L. mucidus. Additionally, L. fumosus and Lactifluus gerardi bear similarities. Other Lactarius species with slippery, grayish caps are either zonate and/or the gills stain purple.

== Distribution and habitat ==
It is native to northwestern North America, often found in coastal and conifer forests.
