= Gymnopilus sordidostipes =

Scientific classification
- Kingdom: Fungi
- Division: Basidiomycota
- Class: Agaricomycetes
- Order: Agaricales
- Family: Hymenogastraceae
- Genus: Gymnopilus
- Species: G. sordidostipes

Binomial name
- Gymnopilus sordidostipes Hesler (1969)

Species of fungus

Gymnopilus sordidostipes Mycological characteristics
- Gills on hymenium
- Cap is convex
- Hymenium is adnexed or adnate
- Ecology is saprotrophic

Gymnopilus sordidostipes is a species of mushroom-forming fungus in the family Hymenogastraceae.

== Description ==
The cap is 4 to 10 centimetres (1.6 to 3.9 in) in diameter.

== Distribution and habitat ==
Gymnopilus sordidostipes has been found growing in clusters on sawdust, in Oregon during November.

== See also ==
- List of Gymnopilus species
