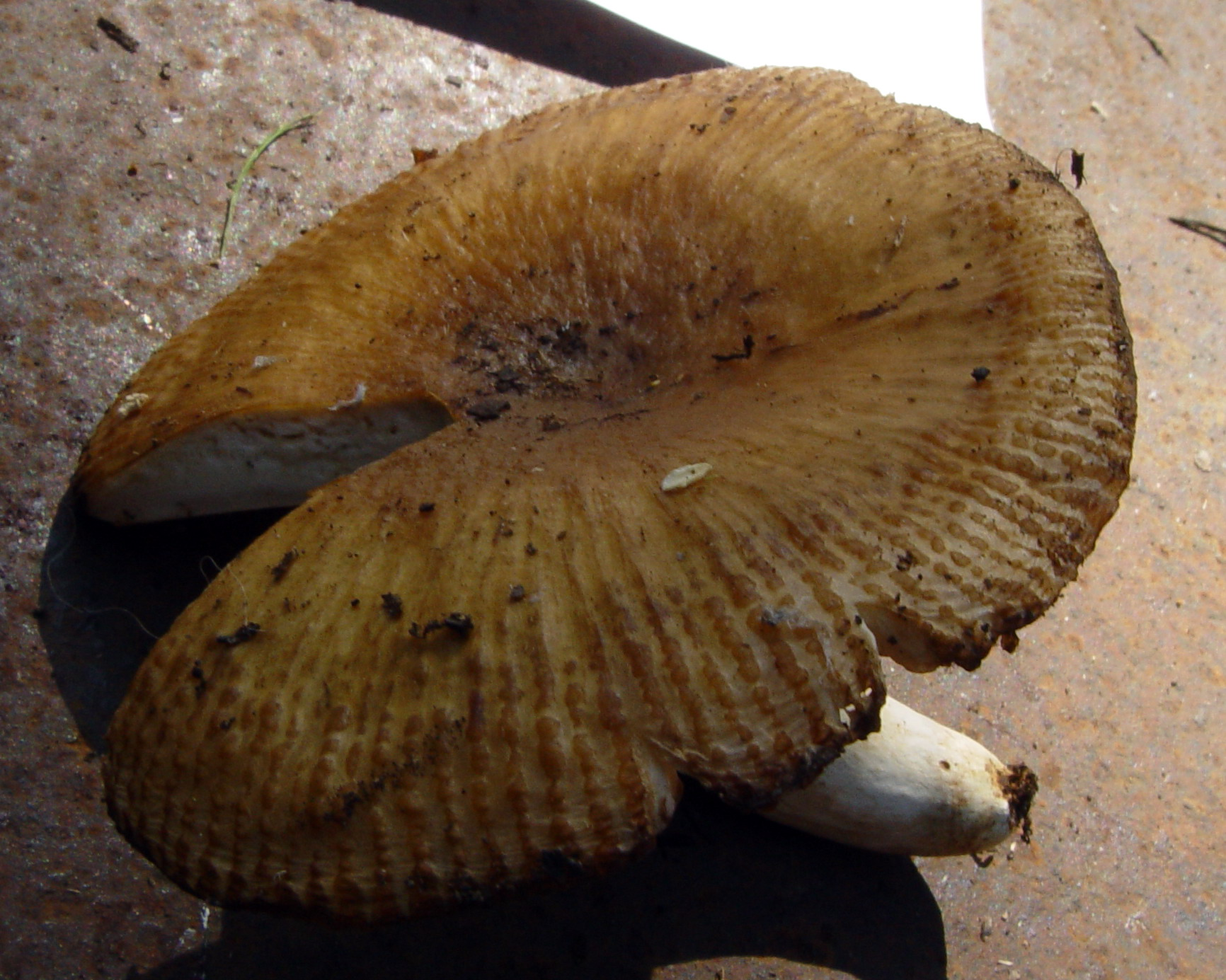

Scientific classification
- Domain: Eukaryota
- Kingdom: Fungi
- Division: Basidiomycota
- Class: Agaricomycetes
- Order: Russulales
- Family: Russulaceae
- Genus: Russula
- Species: R. illota

Binomial name
- Russula illota Romagn., 1954

= Russula illota =

Species of fungus

Russula illota is an inedible species of mushroom in the genus Russula. It is commonly found in deciduous and coniferous forests on chalk.

== Description ==
The cap is spherical when young, later broadly convex and can be flat when old. It is dull ochre and covered in a grey slime, up to 15 cm in diameter. The gills are pale cream and close together, giving off a scent of bitter almonds when rubbed. The spores are also pale cream. The stem is white and becomes blotchy with age.

== Similar species ==
Russula laurocerasi is not yet technically distinguished from this species.

== See also ==
- List of Russula species
