= Gymnopilus subbellulus =

Scientific classification
- Kingdom: Fungi
- Division: Basidiomycota
- Class: Agaricomycetes
- Order: Agaricales
- Family: Hymenogastraceae
- Genus: Gymnopilus
- Species: G. subbellulus

Binomial name
- Gymnopilus subbellulus Hesler (1969)

Species of fungus

Gymnopilus subbellulus Mycological characteristics
- Gills on hymenium
- Cap is convex
- Hymenium is adnexed or adnate
- Ecology is saprotrophic

Gymnopilus subbellulus is a species of mushroom-forming fungus in the family Hymenogastraceae.

== Description ==
The cap is 1 to 2 centimetres (0.4 to 0.8 in) in diameter.

== Habitat and distribution ==
Gymnopilus subbellulus grows on conifer logs. It has been found in Michigan in August.

== See also ==
- List of Gymnopilus species
