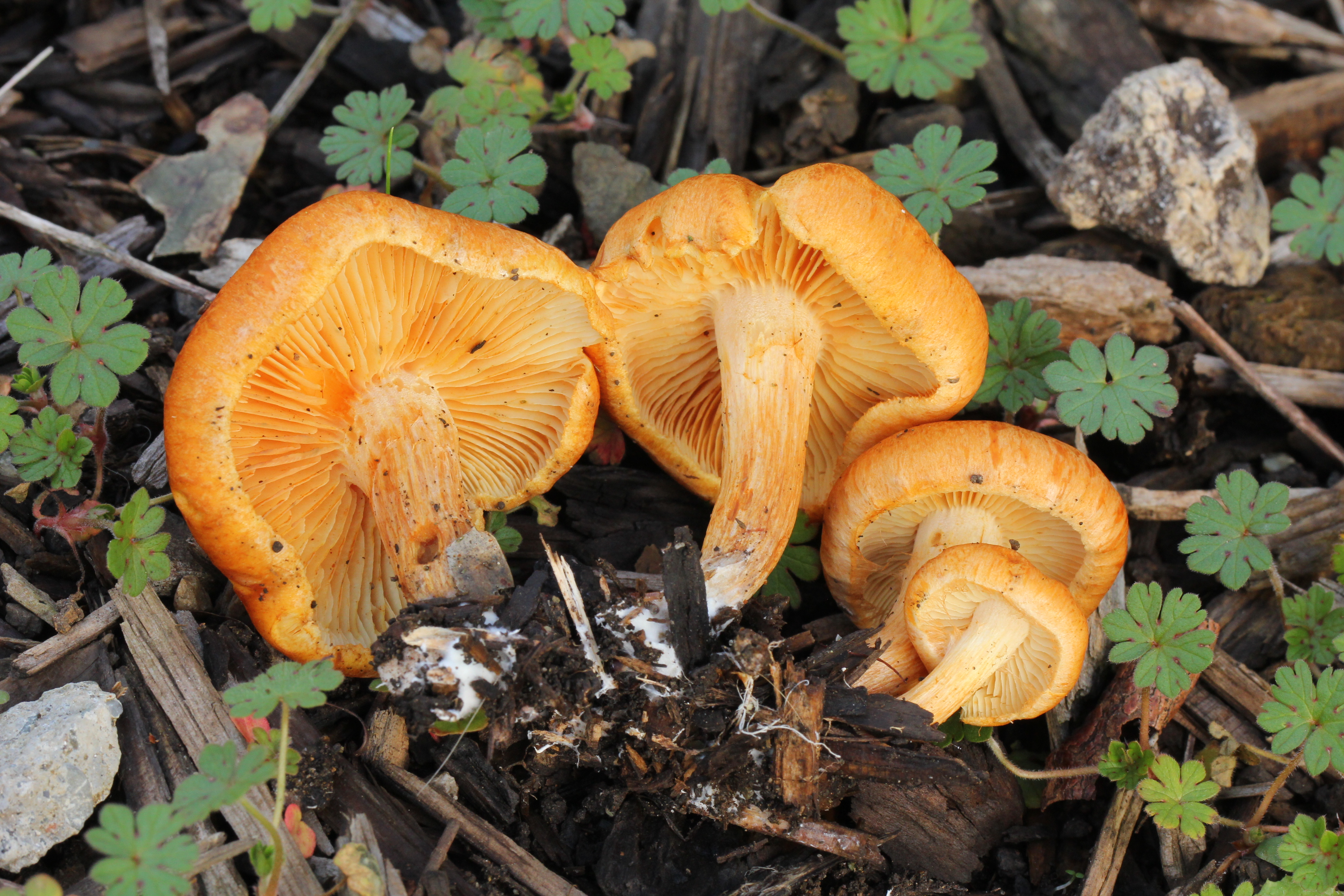
- in San Bruno, California, USA

Scientific classification
- Kingdom: Fungi
- Division: Basidiomycota
- Class: Agaricomycetes
- Order: Agaricales
- Family: Hymenogastraceae
- Genus: Gymnopilus
- Species: G. aurantiophyllus

Binomial name
- Gymnopilus aurantiophyllus Hesler (1969)

= Gymnopilus aurantiophyllus =

Species of fungus

Gymnopilus aurantiophyllus Mycological characteristics
- Gills on hymenium
- Cap is convex
- Hymenium is adnexed or adnate
- Stipe has a cortina
- Spore print is brown
- Ecology is saprotrophic
- Edibility is inedible

Gymnopilus aurantiophyllus is a species of mushroom-forming saprotrophic fungus in the family Hymenogastraceae.

== Description ==
The cap is 4 to 8 cm (1.6 to 3.1 in) in diameter. The caps are a bright yellow orange or ochre. (Part of the binomial name comes from aurantius which is Latin for, more or less, orange.) The gills are "narrowly attached with a distinct notch." Gymnopilus aurantiophyllus has a distinctly bitter taste and is not recommended for eating.

== Habitat and distribution ==
Gymnopilus aurantiophyllus has been found growing in clumps on sawdust, in Oregon, in November. It is found in pine forests and on decaying lignin-rich substrates like wood chips or old stumps. Distribution of this species appears to be primarily the Pacific coast of North America, and it seems to be most frequently observed in the months of December and January.

== See also ==
- List of Gymnopilus species
