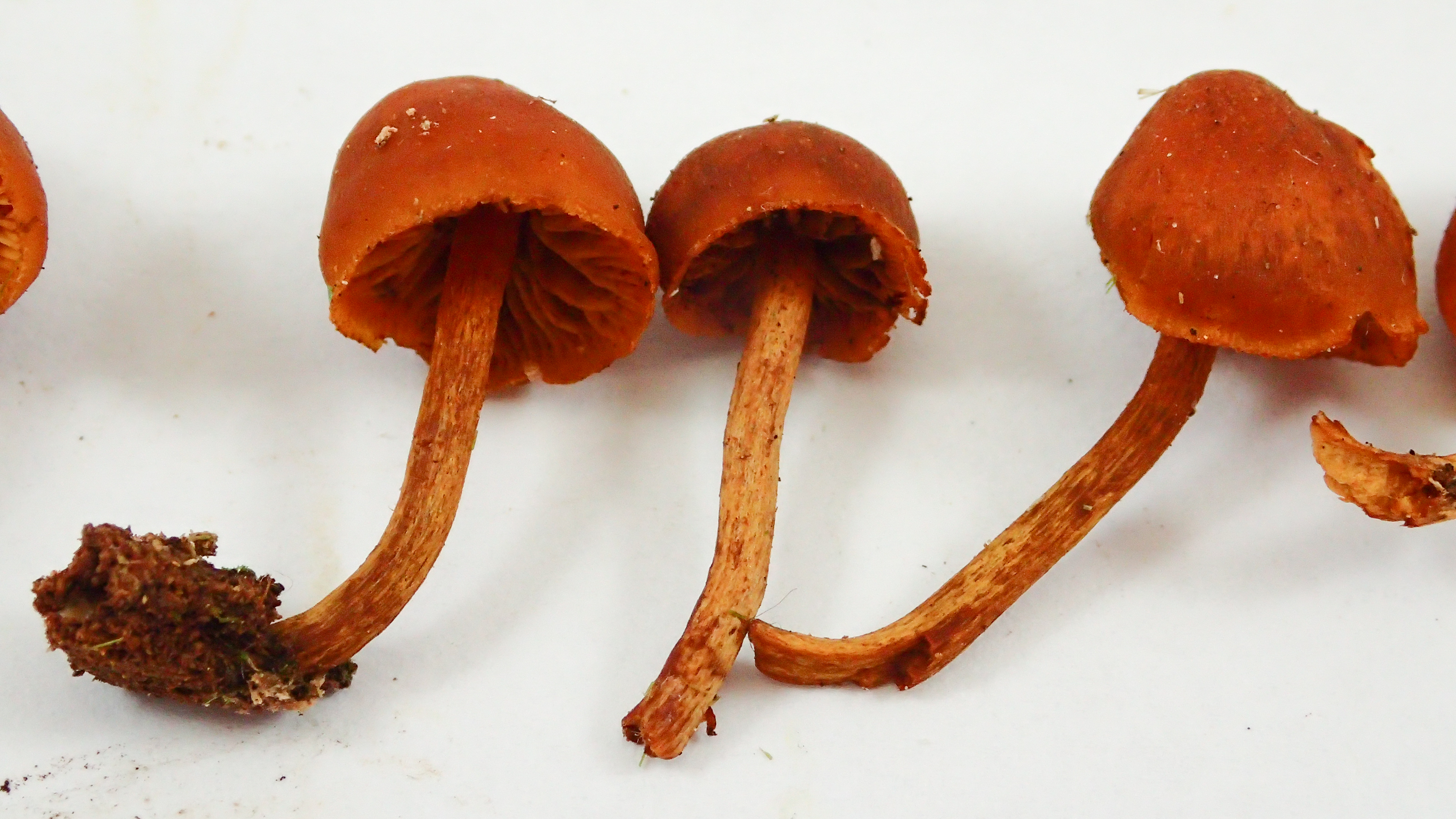

Scientific classification
- Kingdom: Fungi
- Division: Basidiomycota
- Class: Agaricomycetes
- Order: Agaricales
- Family: Hymenogastraceae
- Genus: Gymnopilus
- Species: G. rufescens

Binomial name
- Gymnopilus rufescens Hesler (1969)

= Gymnopilus rufescens =

Species of fungus

Gymnopilus rufescens Mycological characteristics
- Gills on hymenium
- Cap is convex
- Hymenium is adnexed or adnate
- Ecology is saprotrophic

Gymnopilus rufescens is a species of mushroom-forming fungus in the family Hymenogastraceae.

== Description ==
The cap is 1 to 1.5 centimetres (0.4 to 0.6 in) in diameter.

== Habitat and distribution ==
Gymnopilus rufescens grows on conifer wood, and has been found in California during December.

== See also ==
- List of Gymnopilus species
