= Gymnopilus fuscosquamulosus =

Scientific classification
- Kingdom: Fungi
- Division: Basidiomycota
- Class: Agaricomycetes
- Order: Agaricales
- Family: Hymenogastraceae
- Genus: Gymnopilus
- Species: G. fuscosquamulosus

Binomial name
- Gymnopilus fuscosquamulosus Hesler (1969)

Species of fungus

Gymnopilus fuscosquamulosus Mycological characteristics
- Gills on hymenium
- Cap is convex
- Hymenium is adnexed or adnate
- Ecology is saprotrophic

Gymnopilus fuscosquamulosus is a species of mushroom-forming fungus in the family Hymenogastraceae.

== Description ==
The cap is 3 to 7 centimetres (1.2 to 2.8 in) in diameter.

== Habitat and distribution ==
Gymnopilus fuscosquamulosus grows on the roots of buckeye and rhododendron. In North America, it has been collected from North Carolina, in June.

== See also ==
- List of Gymnopilus species
