= Gymnopilus angustifolius =

Scientific classification
- Kingdom: Fungi
- Division: Basidiomycota
- Class: Agaricomycetes
- Order: Agaricales
- Family: Hymenogastraceae
- Genus: Gymnopilus
- Species: G. angustifolius

Binomial name
- Gymnopilus angustifolius Hesler (1969)

Species of fungus

Gymnopilus angustifolius Mycological characteristics
- Gills on hymenium
- Cap is convex
- Hymenium is adnexed or adnate
- Ecology is saprotrophic

Gymnopilus angustifolius is a species of mushroom-forming fungus in the family Hymenogastraceae.

== Description ==
The cap is 1.5 to 3 centimetres (0.6 to 1.2 in) in diameter.

== See also ==
- List of Gymnopilus species
