= Gymnopilus pacificus =

Scientific classification
- Kingdom: Fungi
- Division: Basidiomycota
- Class: Agaricomycetes
- Order: Agaricales
- Family: Hymenogastraceae
- Genus: Gymnopilus
- Species: G. pacificus

Binomial name
- Gymnopilus pacificus Hesler (1969)

Species of fungus

Gymnopilus pacificus Mycological characteristics
- Gills on hymenium
- Cap is convex
- Hymenium is adnexed or adnate
- Ecology is saprotrophic

Gymnopilus pacificus is a species of mushroom-forming fungus in the family Hymenogastraceae.

== Description ==
The cap is 1.2 to 1.8 centimetres (0.5 to 0.7 in) in diameter.

== Habitat and distribution ==
Gymnopilus pacificus grows on wood in Mississippi and Hawaii, between May and June.

== See also ==
- List of Gymnopilus species
