= Gymnopilus decurrens =

Scientific classification
- Kingdom: Fungi
- Division: Basidiomycota
- Class: Agaricomycetes
- Order: Agaricales
- Family: Hymenogastraceae
- Genus: Gymnopilus
- Species: G. decurrens

Binomial name
- Gymnopilus decurrens Hesler (1969)

Species of fungus

Gymnopilus decurrens Mycological characteristics
- Gills on hymenium
- Cap is convex
- Hymenium is adnexed or adnate
- Ecology is saprotrophic

Gymnopilus decurrens is a species of mushroom-forming fungus in the family Hymenogastraceae.

== Description ==
The cap is 2.5 to 6 centimetres (1.0 to 2.4 in) in diameter.

== Habitat and distribution ==
Gymnopilus decurrens fruits on pine, and has been found in California.

== See also ==
- List of Gymnopilus species
