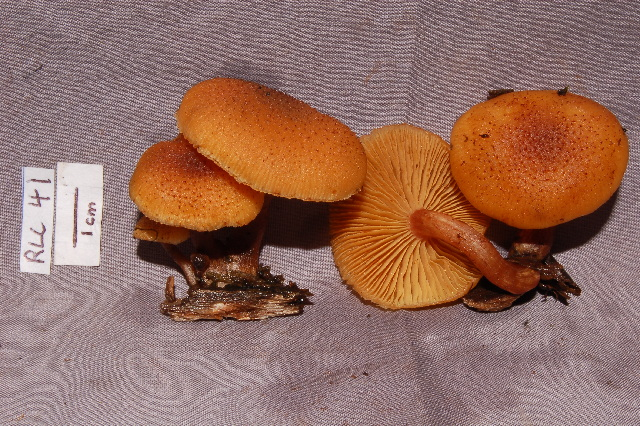

Scientific classification
- Kingdom: Fungi
- Division: Basidiomycota
- Class: Agaricomycetes
- Order: Agaricales
- Family: Hymenogastraceae
- Genus: Gymnopilus
- Species: G. lepidotus

Binomial name
- Gymnopilus lepidotus Hesler (1969)

= Gymnopilus lepidotus =

Species of fungus

Gymnopilus lepidotus
- Mycological characteristics
- Gills on hymenium
- Cap is convex
- Hymenium is adnexed or adnate
- Ecology is saprotrophic

Gymnopilus lepidotus is a species of mushroom-forming fungus in the family Hymenogastraceae.

== Description ==
The cap is 0.4 to 0.8 centimetres (0.2 to 0.3 in) in diameter.

== Habitat and distribution ==
Gymnopilus lepidotus grows on gum logs in Florida, in July.

== Phylogeny ==
This species is in the lepidotus-subearlei grouping.

== See also ==
- List of Gymnopilus species
