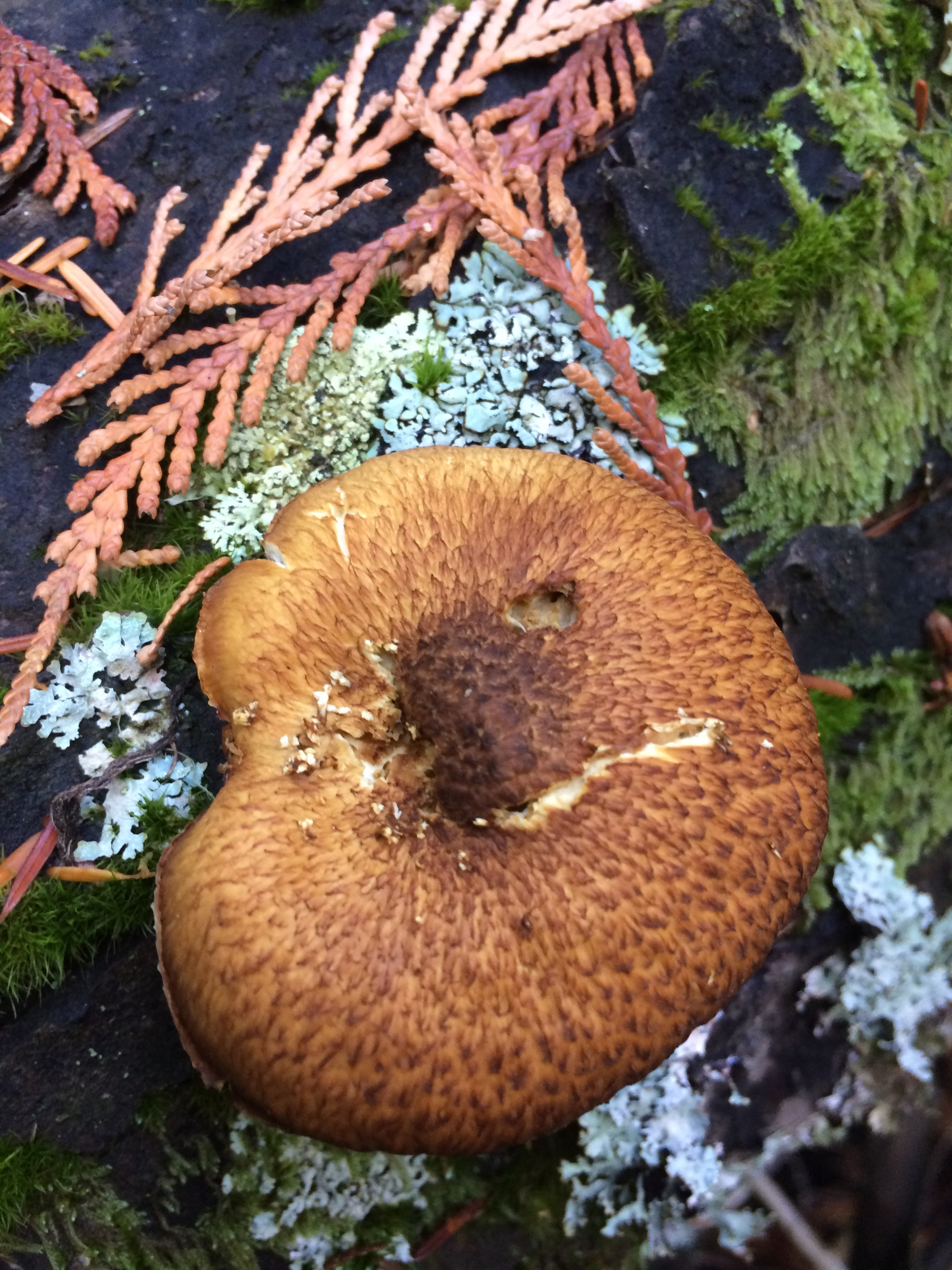
- in Kootenai County, Idaho, United States

Scientific classification
- Kingdom: Fungi
- Division: Basidiomycota
- Class: Agaricomycetes
- Order: Agaricales
- Family: Hymenogastraceae
- Genus: Gymnopilus
- Species: G. parvisquamulosus

Binomial name
- Gymnopilus parvisquamulosus Hesler (1969)

= Gymnopilus parvisquamulosus =

Species of mushroom

Gymnopilus parvisquamulosus Mycological characteristics
- Gills on hymenium
- Cap is convex
- Hymenium is adnexed or adnate
- Ecology is saprotrophic

Gymnopilus parvisquamulosus is a species of mushroom-forming fungus in the family Hymenogastraceae.

== Description ==
The cap is 5 to 9 centimetres (2.0 to 3.5 in) in diameter.

== Habitat and distribution ==
Gymnopilus parvisquamulosus grows in groups on conifer logs. It has been found in California and Maine, between June and August.

== See also ==
- List of Gymnopilus species
