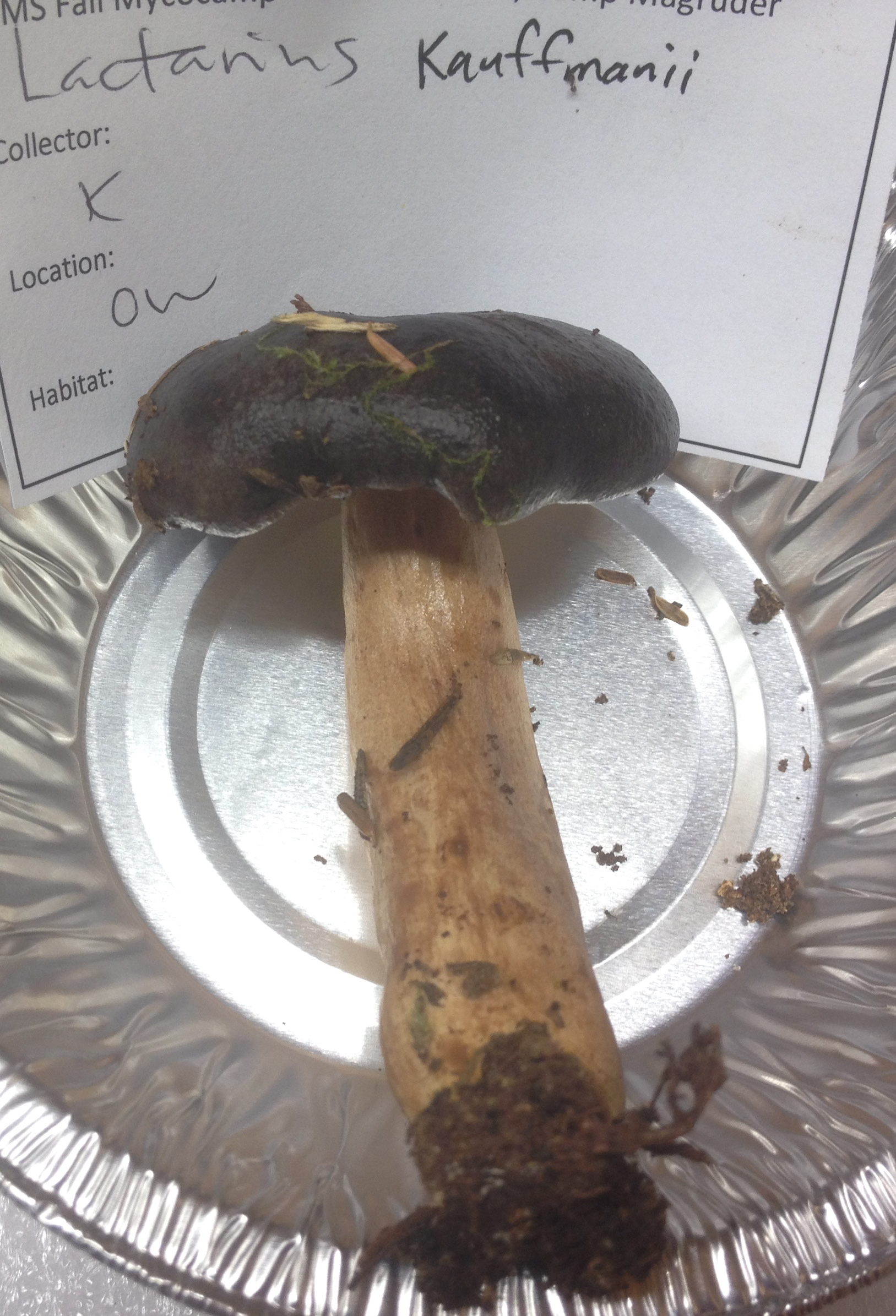

Scientific classification
- Kingdom: Fungi
- Division: Basidiomycota
- Class: Agaricomycetes
- Order: Russulales
- Family: Russulaceae
- Genus: Lactarius
- Species: L. kauffmanii

Binomial name
- Lactarius kauffmanii Hesler & A.H. Sm.

= Lactarius kauffmanii =

Species of fungus

Lactarius kauffmanii
- Mycological characteristics
- Gills on hymenium
- Cap is convex or flat
- Hymenium is adnate or subdecurrent
- Stipe is bare
- Spore print is cream to white
- Ecology is mycorrhizal
- Edibility is unknown

Lactarius kauffmanii is a species of mushroom in the family Russulaceae. It is found in Western North America.

== Taxonomy ==
The species was described as Lactarius kauffmanii in 1979 by the American mycologists Lexemuel Ray Hesler and Alexander H. Smith.

== Etymology ==
The species is named for Calvin Henry Kauffman who collected specimens on his expedition to Lake Cushman, Washington in 1915.

== Description ==
The cap of Lactarius kauffmanii is tan to grayish brown in color and about 4-15 centimeters in diameter. It becomes browner in color as it gets older. It is convex to flat and sometimes depressed. The gills are pale to pinkish and adnate to subdecurrent. The stipe is white or cream to tan in color and becomes ochre or orange as the mushroom gets older. The spore print is white to creamy. When cut, this mushroom produces large amounts milky white latex. This latex leaves orangish tan stains. This mushroom has an acrid taste.

== Habitat and ecology ==
Lactarius kauffmanii is mycorrhizal. It grows under hemlock and fir. It may also grow with other types of conifers. It is found in forests.
