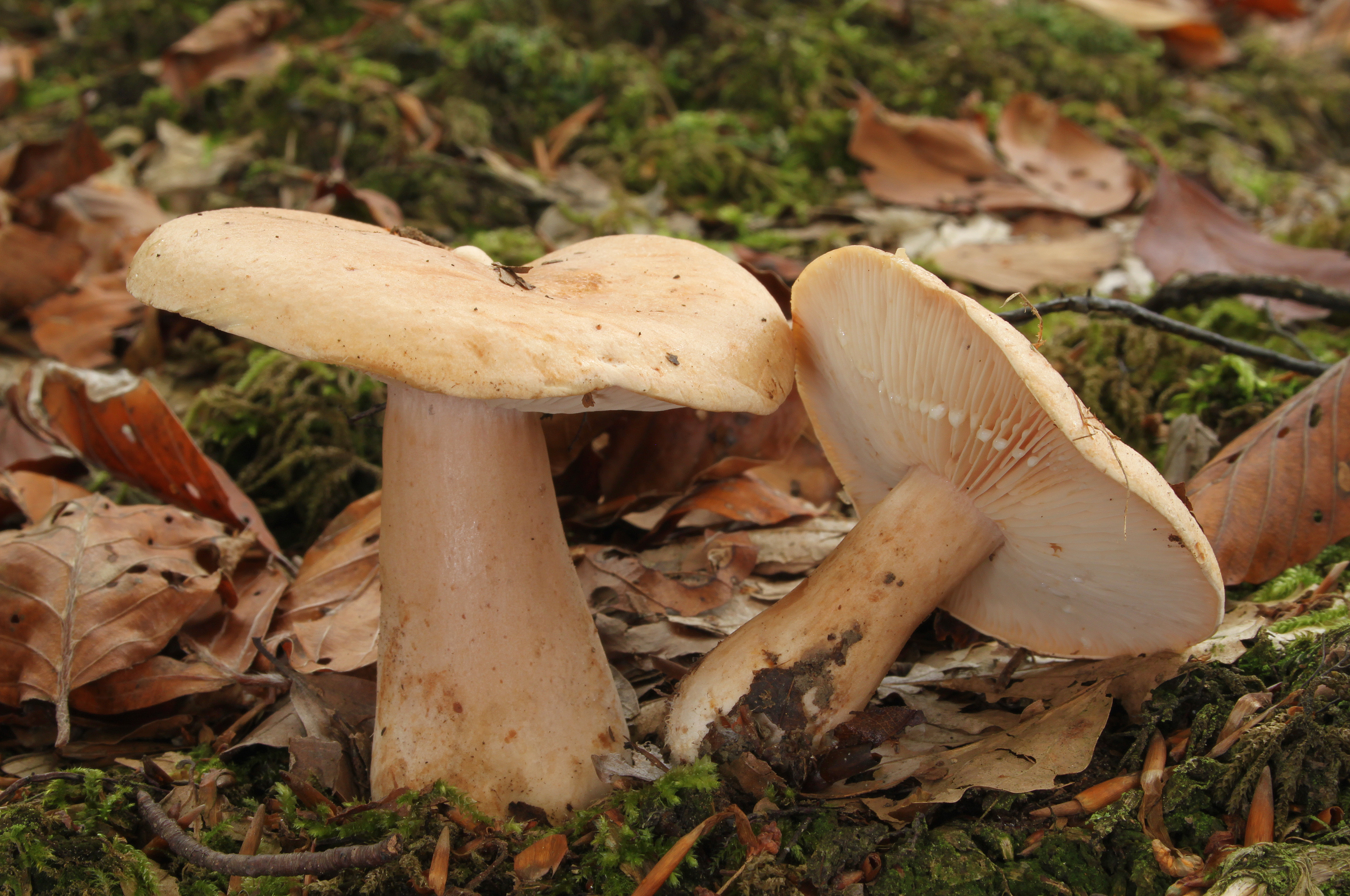

Scientific classification
- Domain: Eukaryota
- Kingdom: Fungi
- Division: Basidiomycota
- Class: Agaricomycetes
- Order: Russulales
- Family: Russulaceae
- Genus: Lactarius
- Species: L. pallidus

Binomial name
- Lactarius pallidus Pers. (1797)

= Lactarius pallidus =

Species of fungus

Lactarius pallidus Mycological characteristics
- Gills on hymenium
- Cap is convex or depressed
- Hymenium is decurrent
- Stipe is bare
- Spore print is ochre
- Ecology is mycorrhizal
- Edibility is edible

Lactarius pallidus, the pale milkcap, is an edible mushroom of the genus Lactarius. It is pale in colour, and found on the floor in beech or birch woodland. It's smooth cap features a particularly thick layer of flesh and often has an incurved margin. Though generally considered edible, it is not recommended to be eaten raw. It is common in Europe, and less common in North America and Australasia.

== Taxonomy ==
Lactarius pallidus was classified as a member of Lactarius by Swedish mycologist Elias Magnus Fries. It was first described by Christian Hendrik Persoon, who named it Agaricus pallidus in his 1797 book Tentamen dispositionis methodicae Fungorum. It is known in English by its common name, the pale milkcap.

== Description ==
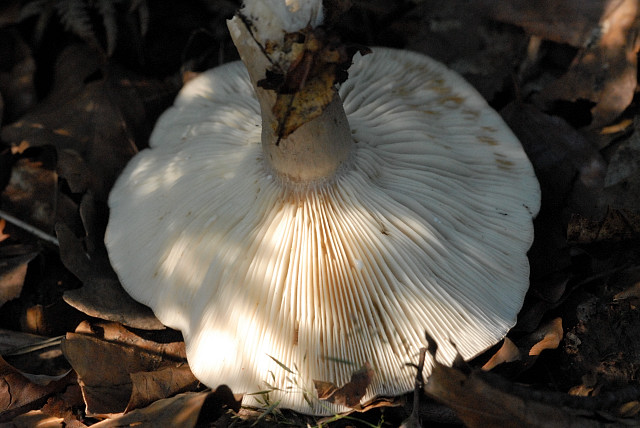
Lactarius pallidus gills

Lactarius pallidus has a cap of 4 to 10 centimetres (1.6 to 3.9 in) across. In shape, it is initially a flattened convex, developing a funnel-shaped depression with age. It is pale buff in colour, sometimes dull but often with a rosy tint. It can also be a pale brown or pale flesh colour. The cap is smooth, firm, and sticky, and has a thick layer of white to buff flesh. The margin is incurved on younger specimens. The pale colour, incurved margin, and smooth cap are its most distinguishing features. The stem is 3 to 8 centimetres (1.2 to 3.1 in) long, by 6 to 28 millimetres (0.24 to 1.10 in) thick. In shape, the stem is cylindrical or slightly narrowed at the base, and is concolorous with the cap or whitish. The moderately decurrent, crowded gills are pale rosy buff to yellowish buff, and leak white milk. The spores are elliptic, with ridges of varying thickness running across them, forming few cross-connections. They typically measure 8 to 10 by 6 to 7 micrometres. The spores leave a spore print that is pale ochre with a slight salmon tinge.

Lactarius pallidus is similar in appearance to L. affinis, but is differentiated by the fact that the former lacks the peppery taste of the latter.

== Edibility ==
Though generally considered edible, especially after cooking, L. pallidus has been described by some mycologists as inedible. The milk has a mild to moderately hot taste.

== Distribution and habitat ==
Lactarius pallidus is typically found growing mycorrhizally under beech, but can also be found under birch. It is typically half-buried among leaf litter. It can sometimes be found in large groups, and occurs throughout summer and autumn. It can be found commonly in Europe but is much rarer in North America. It can also be found in Australia.

== See also ==
- List of Lactarius species
