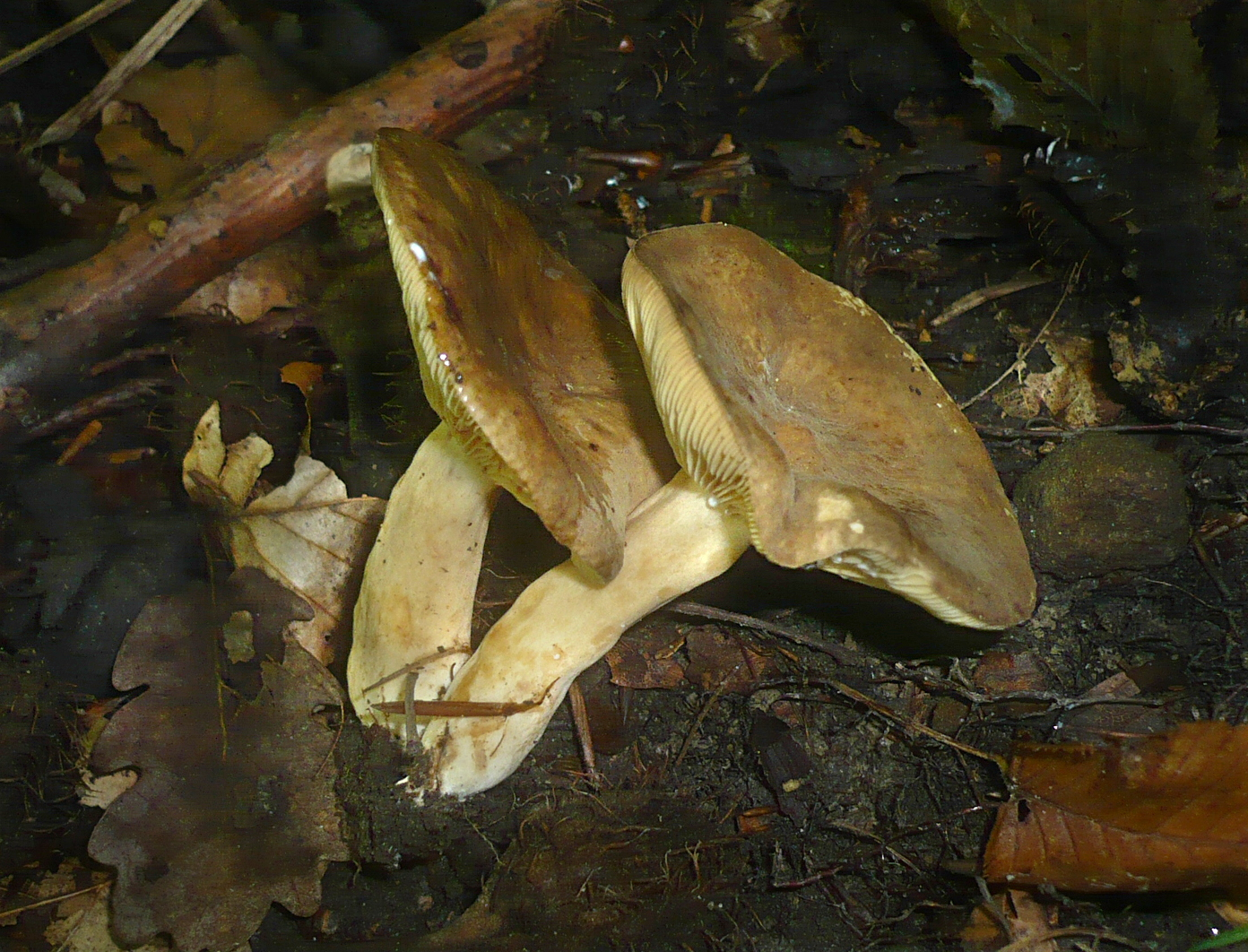

Scientific classification
- Domain: Eukaryota
- Kingdom: Fungi
- Division: Basidiomycota
- Class: Agaricomycetes
- Order: Russulales
- Family: Russulaceae
- Genus: Lactarius
- Species: L. azonites

Binomial name
- Lactarius azonites (Bull.) Fr., 1838

= Lactarius azonites =

Species of fungus

Lactarius azonites is a species of fungus belonging to the family Russulaceae.

It is native to Europe and Northern America.
