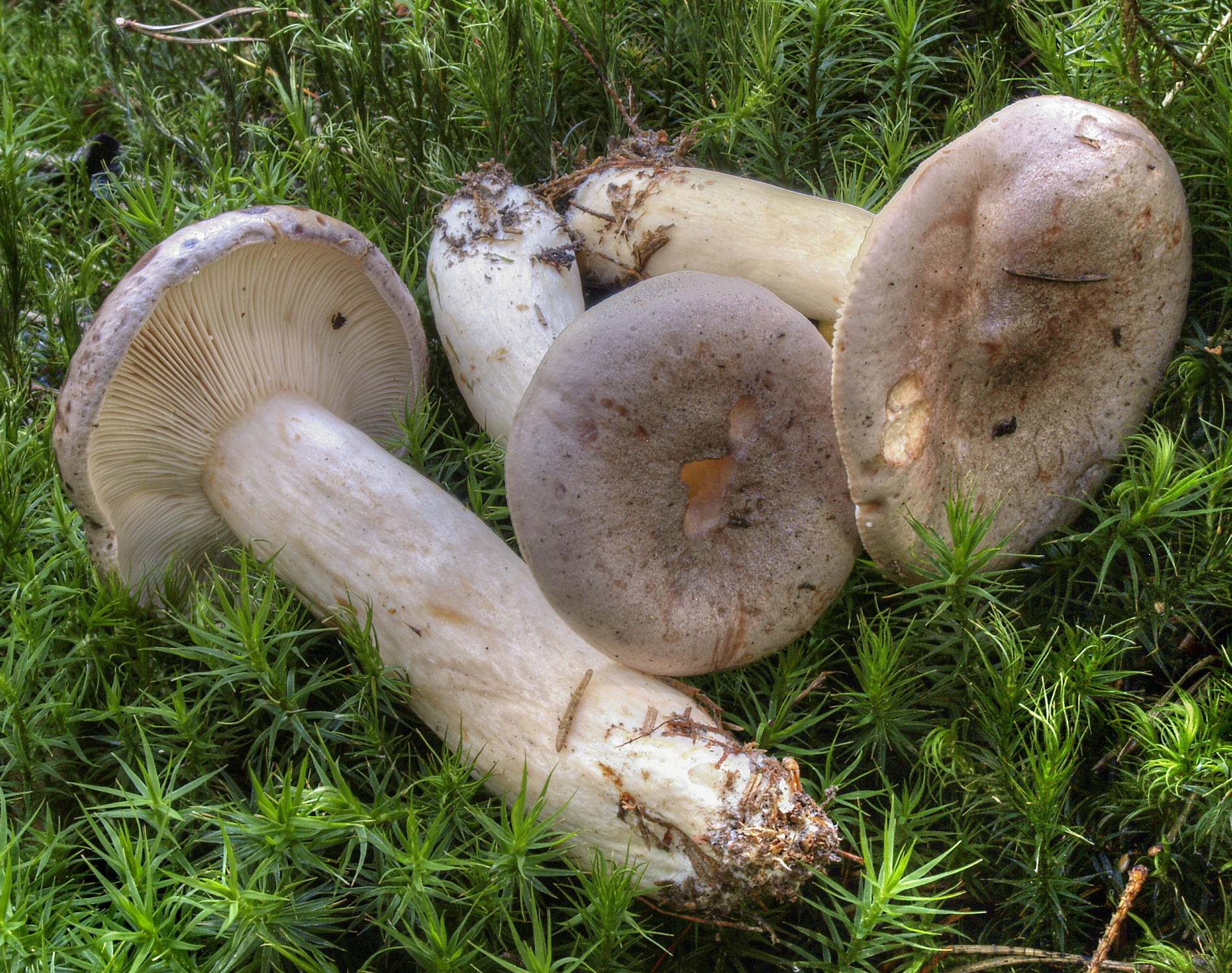

Scientific classification
- Domain: Eukaryota
- Kingdom: Fungi
- Division: Basidiomycota
- Class: Agaricomycetes
- Order: Russulales
- Family: Russulaceae
- Genus: Lactarius
- Species: L. trivialis

Binomial name
- Lactarius trivialis (Fr.) Fr.

= Lactarius trivialis =

Species of fungus

Lactarius trivialis is a species of mushroom belonging to the genus Lactarius. The fungus is most commonly found in Scandinavia. The colour of the mushroom's cap can range from a light brown colour, to dark purple. The species has a total of five subtaxa. It was discovered and first recorded in the year 1838 by Elias Magnus Fries, in his book, Epicrisis Systematis Mycologici.

== See also ==
- List of Lactarius species
