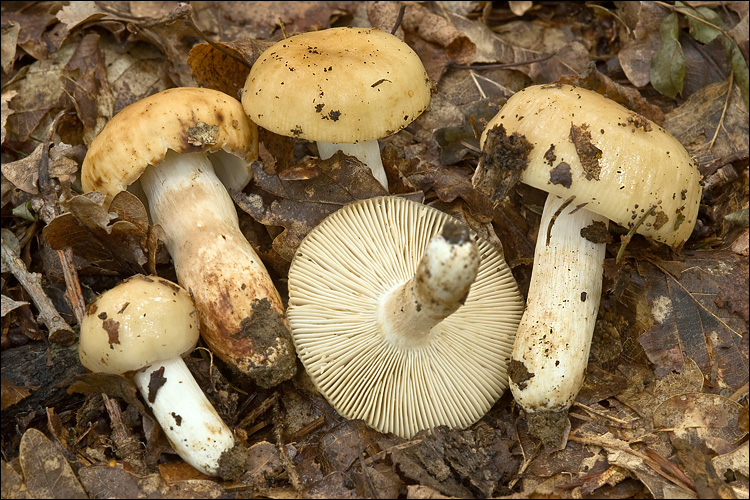

Scientific classification
- Domain: Eukaryota
- Kingdom: Fungi
- Division: Basidiomycota
- Class: Agaricomycetes
- Order: Russulales
- Family: Russulaceae
- Genus: Russula
- Species: R. grata

Binomial name
- Russula grata Britzelm.

Synonyms
- Russula laurocerasi

= Russula grata =

Species of fungus

Russula grata is a species of fungus belonging to the family Russulaceae.

It has a cosmopolitan distribution.
