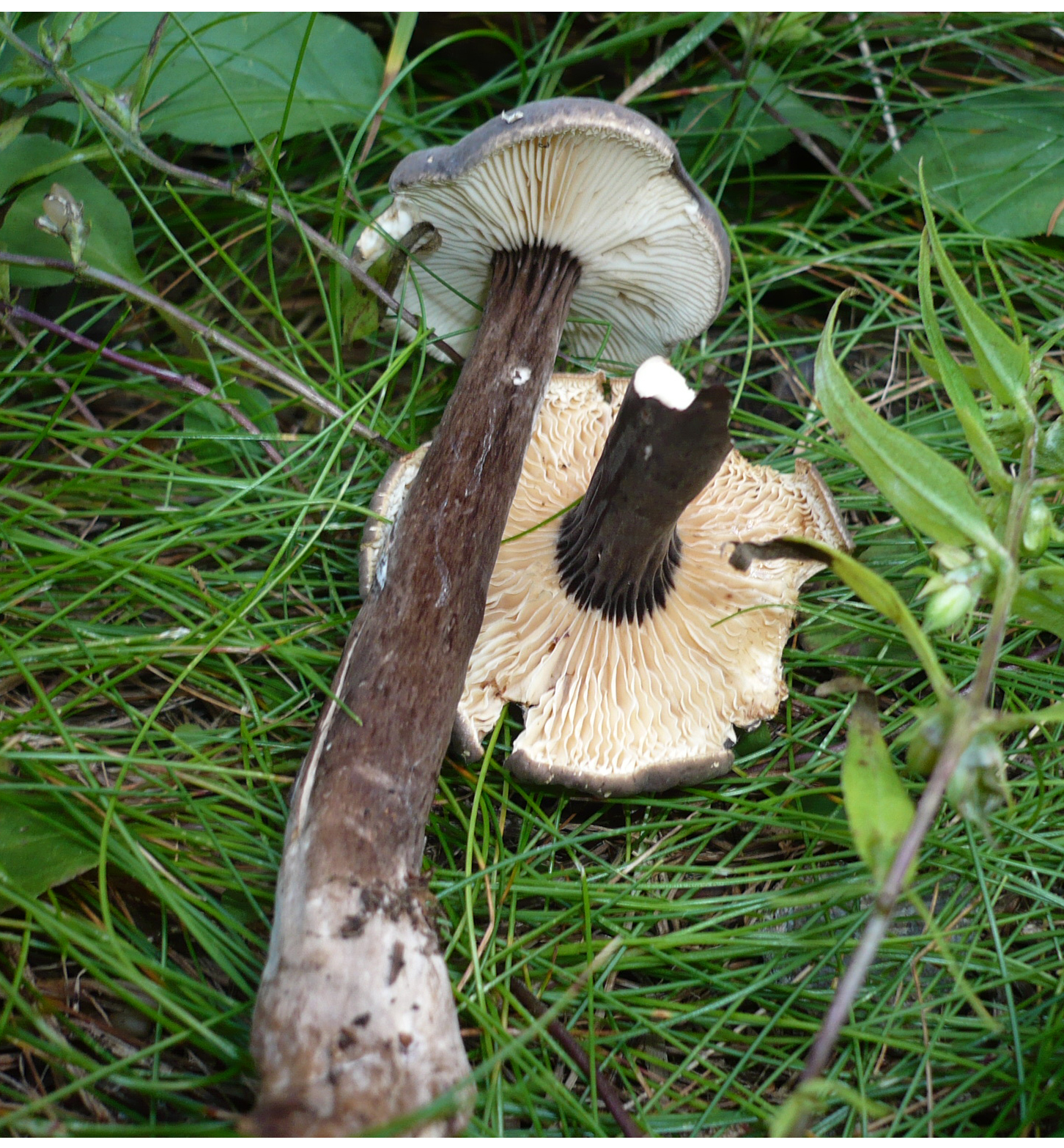

Scientific classification
- Domain: Eukaryota
- Kingdom: Fungi
- Division: Basidiomycota
- Class: Agaricomycetes
- Order: Russulales
- Family: Russulaceae
- Genus: Lactarius
- Species: L. lignyotus

Binomial name
- Lactarius lignyotus Fr. (1855)

Synonyms
- Lactariella lignyota (Fr.) J.Schröt. (1889); Lactifluus lignyotus (Fr.) Kuntze (1891)

= Lactarius lignyotus =

Species of fungus

Lactarius lignyotus (chocolate milky) is a member of the large milk-cap genus Lactarius in the order Russulales. It was first described scientifically by Elias Magnus Fries in 1855.

The cap is up to 10 centimetres (4 in) wide and brown. The stalk is brown and white at the base. The flesh oozes a milky latex when split. It has a yellow or ochre spore print.

It can be found in coniferous woodland in eastern North America. It is considered edible, but of little interest.

== See also ==
- List of Lactarius species
