= Lexemuel Ray Hesler =

American mycologist (1888–1977)

- Born: February 20, 1888; Veedersburg, Indiana
- Died: November 20, 1977 (aged 89)
- Known for: Taxonomy of Agarics of the Southern Appalachians
- Scientific career
- Fields: Mycology
- Workplaces: University of Tennessee
- Doctoral advisor: Mason B. Thomas
- Author abbrev. (botany): Hesler

Lexemuel Ray Hesler (20 February 1888 – 20 November 1977) was an American mycologist. He was the son of Clinton F. Hesler and Laura Iris (née Youngblood). He obtained his B.A. degree with Wabash College in 1911 and his Ph.D. at the University of Cornell in 1914.

== Selected publications ==
- Hesler LR. (1929) "A preliminary report on polypores of eastern Tennessee", Journal of the Tennessee Academy of Science 4: 3–10
- Hesler LR. (1936) "Notes on southern Appalachian fungi", Journal of the Tennessee Academy of Science 6: 107–122
- Hesler LR. (1937) "Notes on southern Appalachian fungi: II.", Journal of the Tennessee Academy of Science 12: 239–254
- Hesler LR. (1937) "A preliminary list of the fungi of the Great Smoky Mountains", Castanea 2: 45–58
- Hesler LR. (1957) "Notes on southeastern Agaricales: I.", Journal of the Tennessee Academy of Science 32: 298–307
- Hesler LR. (1960) "A study of Russula types: ", Memoirs of the Torrey Botanical Club 21: 1–59
- Hesler LR. (1961) "A study of Julius Schaeffer's Russulas", Lloydia 24: 182–198
- Hesler LR. (1961) "A Study of Russula types: 2", Mycologia 53: 605–625
- Hesler LR, Smith AH. (1963) North American Species of Hygrophorus
- Hesler LR, Smith AH. (1965) North American species of Crepidotus
- Hesler LR. (1967) Entoloma in Southeastern North America
- Smith AH, Hesler LR. (1968) The North American species of Pholiota
- Hesler LR. (1969) North American species of Gymnopilus
- Hesler LR, Smith AH. (1979) North American Species of Lactarius

== See also ==
- Category:Taxa named by Lexemuel Ray Hesler
- List of mycologists
