= List of Lactifluus species =

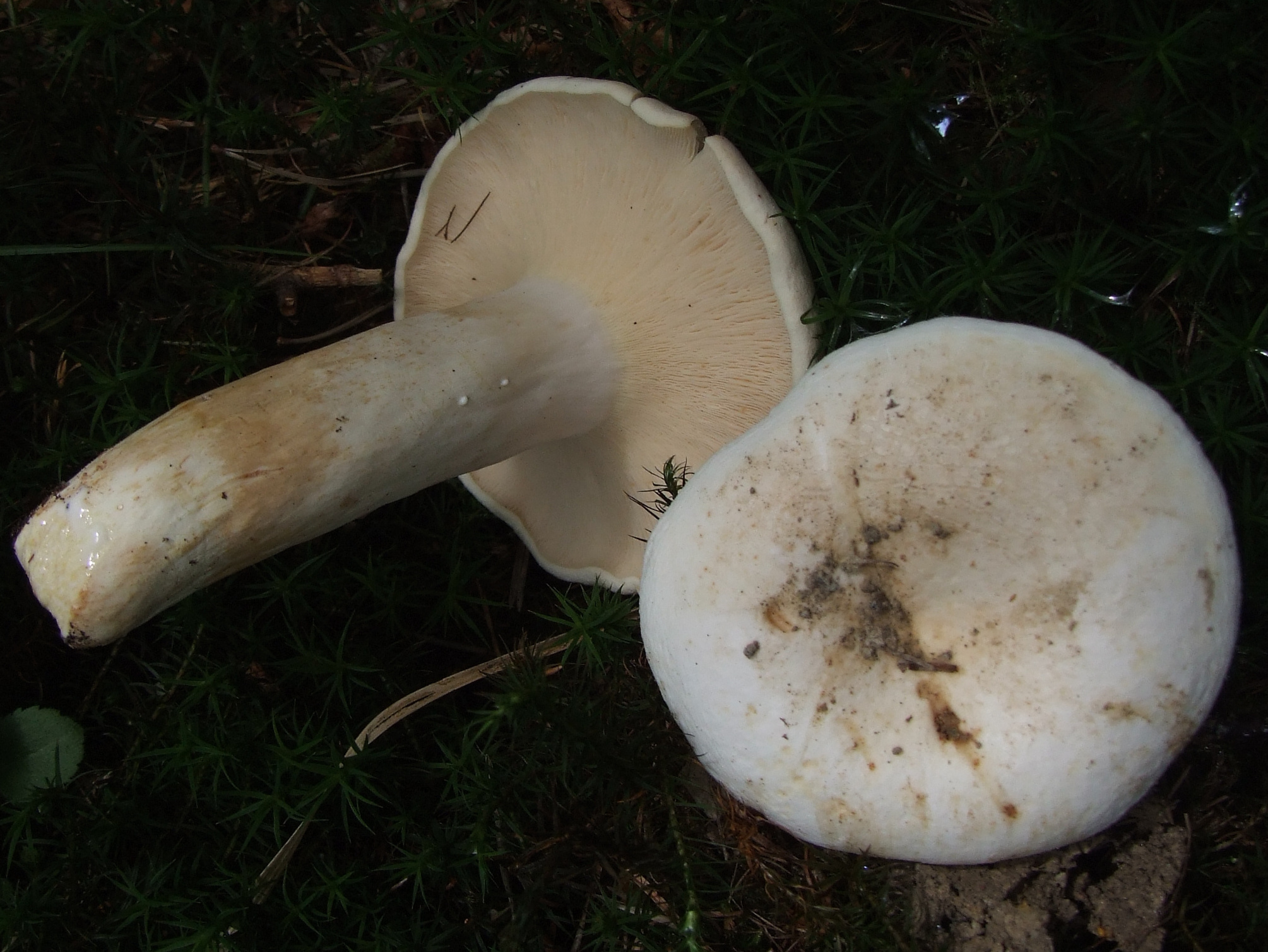
Lactifluus piperatus is the type species of the genus Lactifluus.

Lactifluus is a genus of milk cap fungi in the family Russulaceae. Its species were formerly classified in Lactarius but have been split off as separate genus based on molecular phylogenetic evidence. A 2017 revision divided the genus in four subgenera: Lactifluus, Lactariopsis, Gymnocarpi and Pseudogymnocarpi. Within the subgenera, sections have been recognised, but not all of the roughly 150 species could be assigned to named sections.

== Subgenus Lactifluus ==
Lactifluus subg. Lactifluus

Lactifluus sect. Lactifluus

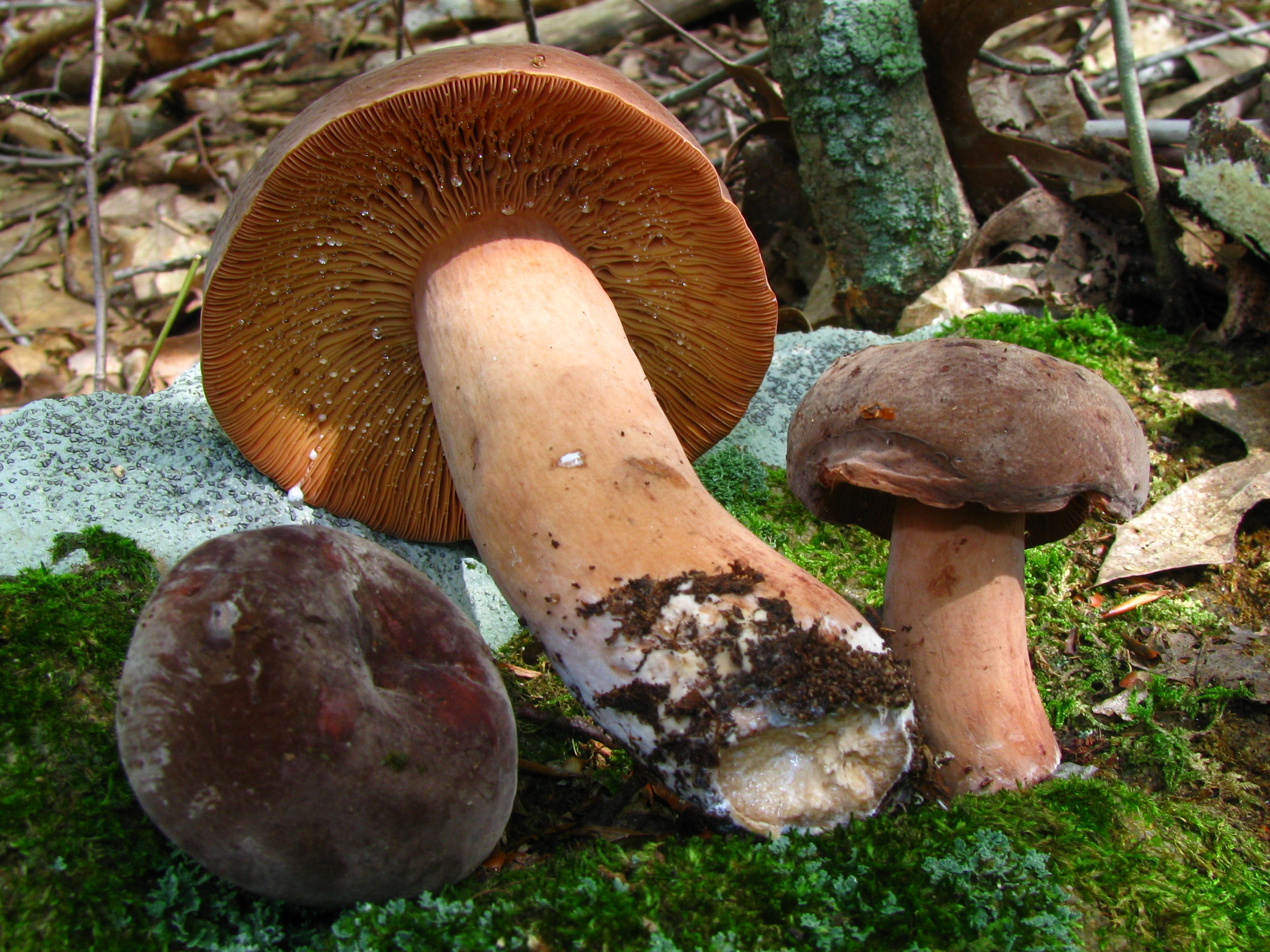
Lactifluus corrugis

- Lactifluus acicularis (Van de Putte & Verbeken) Van de Putte 2012
- Lactifluus bicapillus De Crop, Lescroart, Njouonkou, et al., 2019
- Lactifluus corrugis (Peck) Kuntze 1891
- Lactifluus crocatus (Van de Putte & Verbeken) Van de Putte 2012
- Lactifluus distantifolius (Van de Putte, Stubbe & Verbeken) Van de Putte 2012
- Lactifluus jetiae L. Vaughan, L. Tegart, J. Douch & T. Lebel
- Lactifluus lamprocystidiatus (Verbeken & E.Horak) Verbeken 2012
- Lactifluus longipilus (Van de Putte, H.T.Le & Verbeken) Van de Putte 2012
- Lactifluus oedematopus (Scop.) Kuntze (1891)
- Lactifluus pagodicystidiatus L. Vaughan, L. Tegart & J. Douch
- Lactifluus pinguis (Van de Putte & Verbeken) Van de Putte 2012
- Lactifluus rugulostipitatus J. Douch, L. Tegart, L. Vaughan & T. Lebel
- Lactifluus vitellinus (Van de Putte & Verbeken) Van de Putte 2012
- Lactifluus volemus (Fr.) Kuntze (1891)

Lactifluus sect. Gerardii

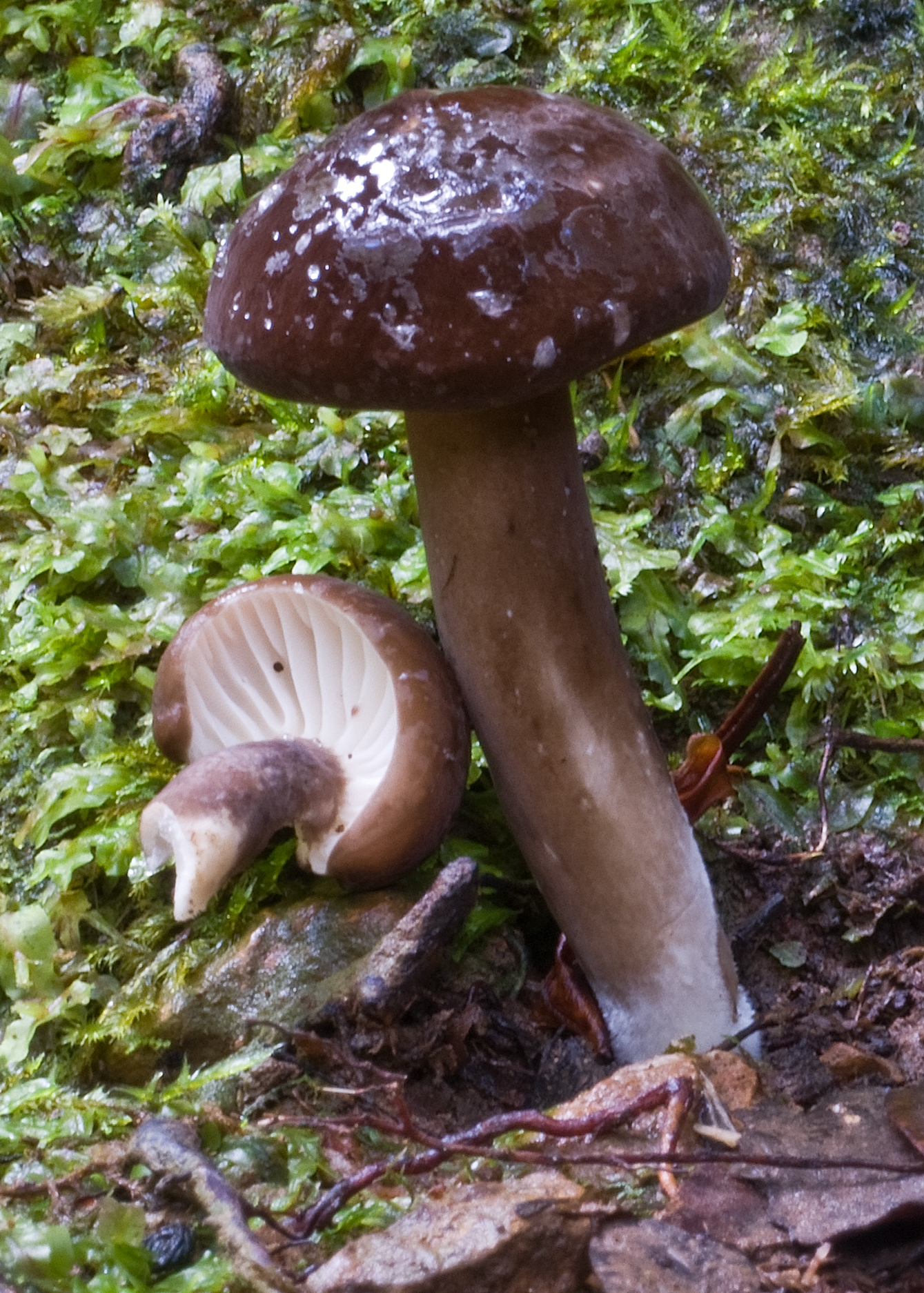
Lactifluus wirrabara

- Lactifluus atrovelutinus (J.Z.Ying) X.H.Wang 2012
- Lactifluus bicolor (Massee) Verbeken 2012
- Lactifluus conchatulus (Stubbe & H.T.Le) Stubbe 2012
- Lactifluus coniculus (Stubbe & Verbeken) Verbeken 2012
- Lactifluus genevievae (Stubbe & Verbeken) Stubbe 2012
- Lactifluus hora (Stubbe & Verbeken) Stubbe 2012
- Lactifluus igniculus E.S.Popov & O.V.Morozova 2013
- Lactifluus leae (Stubbe & Verbeken) Verbeken 2012
- Lactifluus leonardii (Stubbe & Verbeken) Stubbe 2012
- Lactifluus limbatus (Stubbe & Verbeken) Stubbe 2012
- Lactifluus ochrogalactus (Hashiya) X.H.Wang 2012
- Lactifluus parvigerardii X.H.Wang & D.Stubbe 2012
- Lactifluus petersenii (Hesler & A.H.Sm.) Stubbe 2012
- Lactifluus reticulatovenosus (Verbeken & E.Horak) Verbeken 2012
- Lactifluus sepiaceus (McNabb) Stubbe 2012
- Lactifluus subgerardii (Hesler & A.H.Sm.) Stubbe 2012
- Lactifluus uyedae (Singer) Verbeken 2012
- Lactifluus venosus (Verbeken & E.Horak) Verbeken 2012
- Lactifluus wirrabara (Grgur.) Stubbe 2012

Lactifluus sect. Tenuicystidiati

- Lactifluus tenuicystidiatus (X.H.Wang & Verbeken) X.H.Wang 2012

Lactifluus sect. Ambicystidiati

Lactifluus ambicystidiatus X.H. Wang 2015

Lactifluus sect. Allardii (Hesler & A.H.Sm.) De Crop 2012

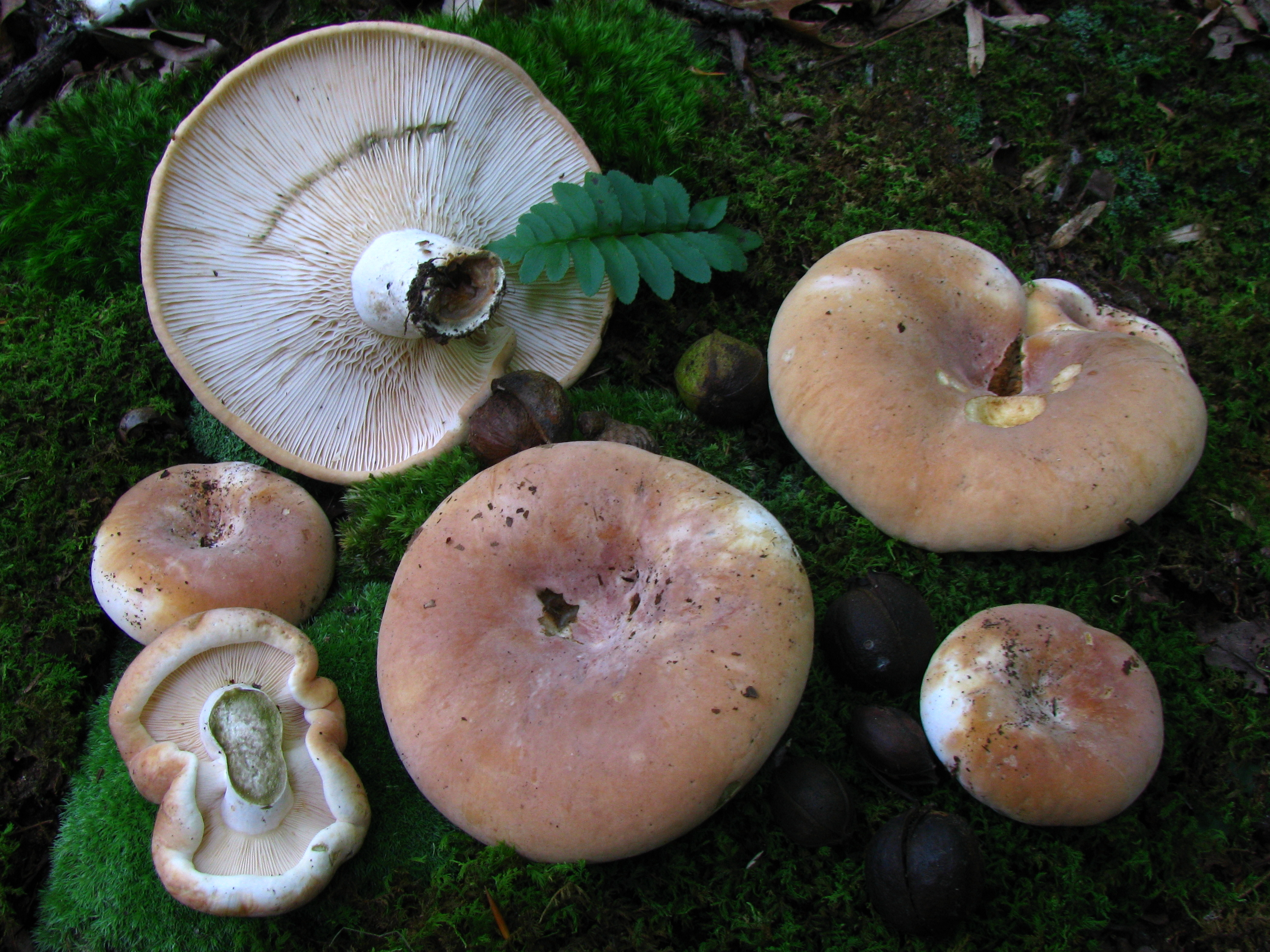
Lactifluus allardii

- Lactifluus allardii (Coker) De Crop 2012

Lactifluus sect. Piperati (Fr.) Verbeken 2012

- Lactifluus dwaliensis (K.Das, J.R.Sharma & Verbeken) K.Das 2012
- Lactifluus glaucescens (Crossl.) Verbeken 2012
- Lactifluus leucophaeus (Verbeken & E.Horak) Verbeken 2012
- Lactifluus piperatus (L.) Kuntze (1891)
- Lactifluus roseophyllus (R.Heim) De Crop 2012

== Subgenus Lactariopsis ==
Lactifluus subgen. Lactariopsis (Henn.) Verbeken 2011

Lactifluus sect. Albati (Bataille) Verbeken 2011

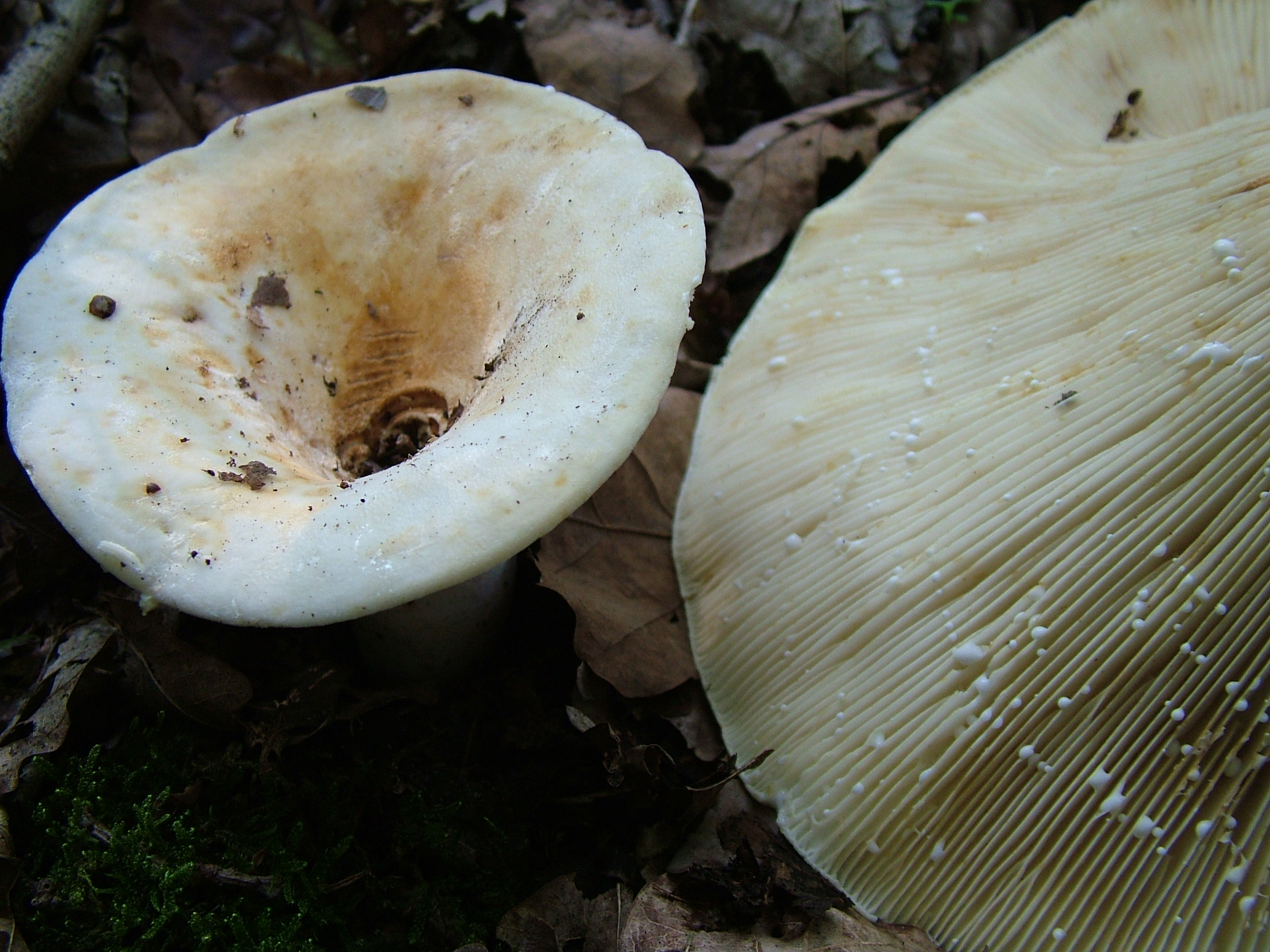
Lactifluus vellereus

- Lactifluus bertillonii (Neuhoff ex Z.Schaef.) Verbeken 2011
- Lactifluus deceptivus (Peck) Kuntze (1885)
- Lactifluus pilosus (Verbeken, H.T.Le & Lumyong) Verbeken 2011
- Lactifluus subvellereus (Peck) Nuytinck 2011
- Lactifluus vellereus (Fr.) Kuntze (1821)

Lactifluus sect. Edules (Verbeken) Verbeken 2017

- Lactifluus aureifolius (Verbeken) Verbeken 2011
- Lactifluus edulis (Verbeken & Buyck) Buyck 2011
- Lactifluus indusiatus (Verbeken) Verbeken 2011
- Lactifluus inversus (Gooss.-Font & R.Heim) Verbeken 2011
- Lactifluus latifolius (Gooss.-Font & R.Heim) Verbeken 2011
- Lactifluus nodosicystidiosus (Verbeken & Buyck) Buyck 2011
- Lactifluus phlebophyllus (R.Heim) Buyck 2011
- Lactifluus roseolus (Verbeken) Verbeken 2011

Lactifluus sect. Lactariopsis (Henn.) Verbeken 2011

- Lactifluus annulatoangustifolius (Beeli) Buyck 2011
- Lactifluus chamaeleontinus (R.Heim) Verbeken 2011
- Lactifluus heimii (Verbeken) Verbeken 2011
- Lactifluus laevigatus (Verbeken) Verbeken 2011
- Lactifluus pelliculatus (Beeli) Buyck 2011
- Lactifluus pruinatus (Verbeken & Buyck) Verbeken 2011
- Lactifluus sesemotani (Beeli) Buyck 2011
- Lactifluus velutissimus (Verbeken) Verbeken 2011
- Lactifluus zenkeri (Henn.) Verbeken 2011

Lactifluus sect. Russulopsidei (Verbeken) Verbeken 2011

- Lactifluus cyanovirescens (Verbeken) Verbeken 2011
- Lactifluus longipes (Verbeken) Verbeken 2011
- Lactifluus ruvubuensis (Verbeken) Verbeken 2011
- Lactifluus urens (Verbeken) Verbeken 2011

Not assigned to a section

- Lactifluus annulifer (Singer) Nuytinck 2011
- Lactifluus brachystegiae (Verbeken & C.Sharp) Verbeken 2011
- Lactifluus cocosmus (Van de Putte & De Kesel) Van de Putte 2012
- Lactifluus densifolius (Verbeken & Karhula) Verbeken 2011
- Lactifluus emergens (Verbeken) Verbeken 2011
- Lactifluus leoninus (Verbeken & E.Horak) Verbeken 2011
- Lactifluus neotropicus (Singer) Nuytinck 2011
- Lactifluus madagascariensis (Verbeken & Buyck) Buyck 2011

== Subgenus Gymnocarpi ==
Lactifluus sect. Luteoli

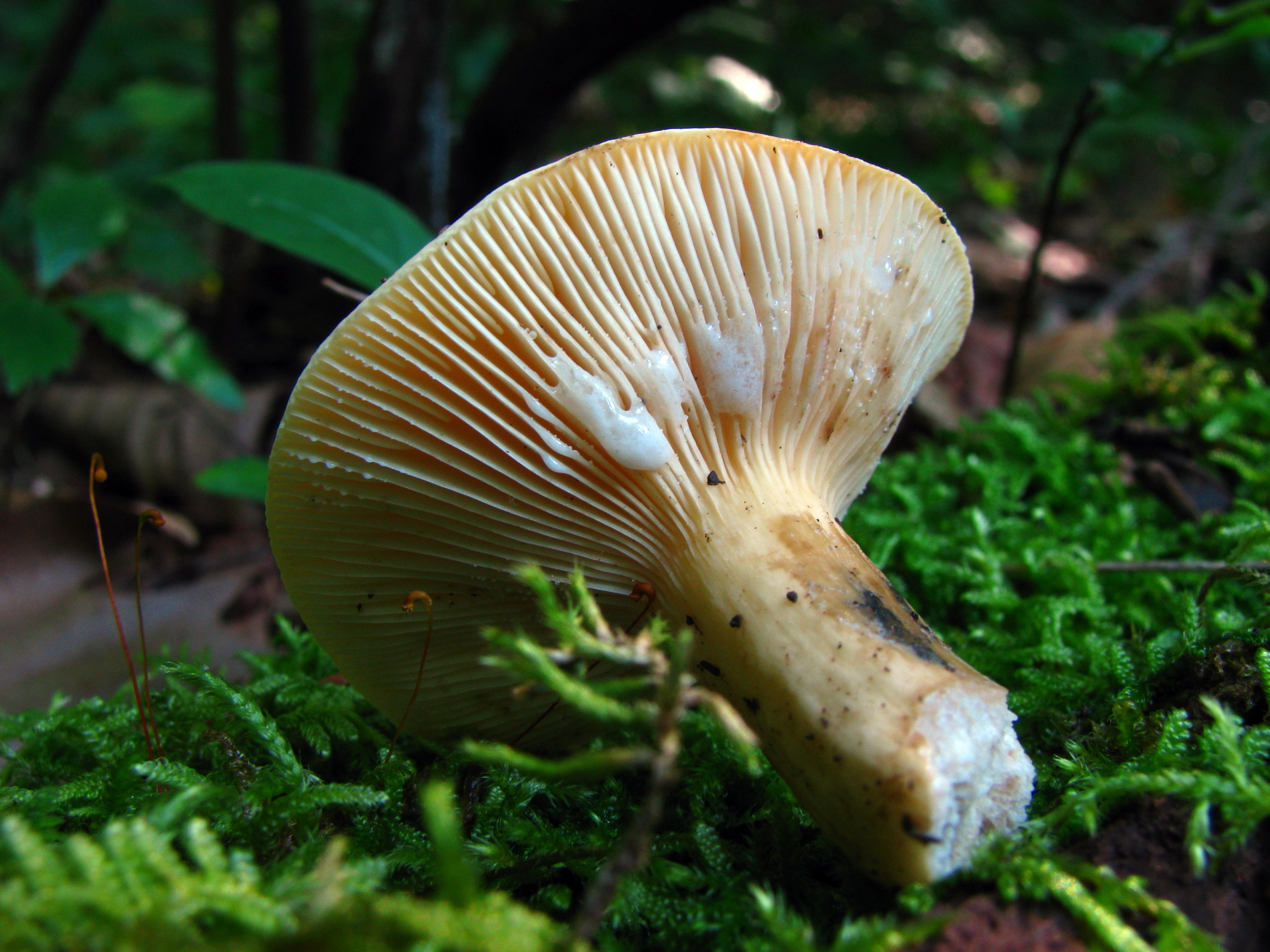
Lactifluus luteolus

- Lactifluus brunneoviolascens (Bon) Verbeken 2012
- Lactifluus longivelutinus (X.H.Wang & Verbeken) X.H.Wang 2012
- Lactifluus luteolus (Peck) Verbeken 2012
- Lactifluus nonpiscis (Verbeken) Verbeken 2012
- Lactifluus rubrobrunnescens (Verbeken, E.Horak & Desjardin) Verbeken 2012

Lactifluus sect. Gymnocarpi

- Lactifluus albocinctus (Verbeken) Verbeken 2012
- Lactifluus caribaeus (Pegler) Verbeken 2012
- Lactifluus flammans (Verbeken) Verbeken 2012
- Lactifluus gymnocarpus (R.Heim ex Singer) Verbeken 2012
- Lactifluus putidus (Pegler) Verbeken 2012
- Lactifluus tanzanicus (Karhula & Verbeken) Verbeken 2012

Lactifluus sect. Phlebonemi (R.Heim ex Verbeken) Verbeken 2012

- Lactifluus brunnescens (Verbeken) Verbeken 2012
- Lactifluus phlebonemus (R.Heim & Gooss.-Font.) Verbeken 2012

Lactifluus sect. Tomentosi (McNabb) Verbeken 2012

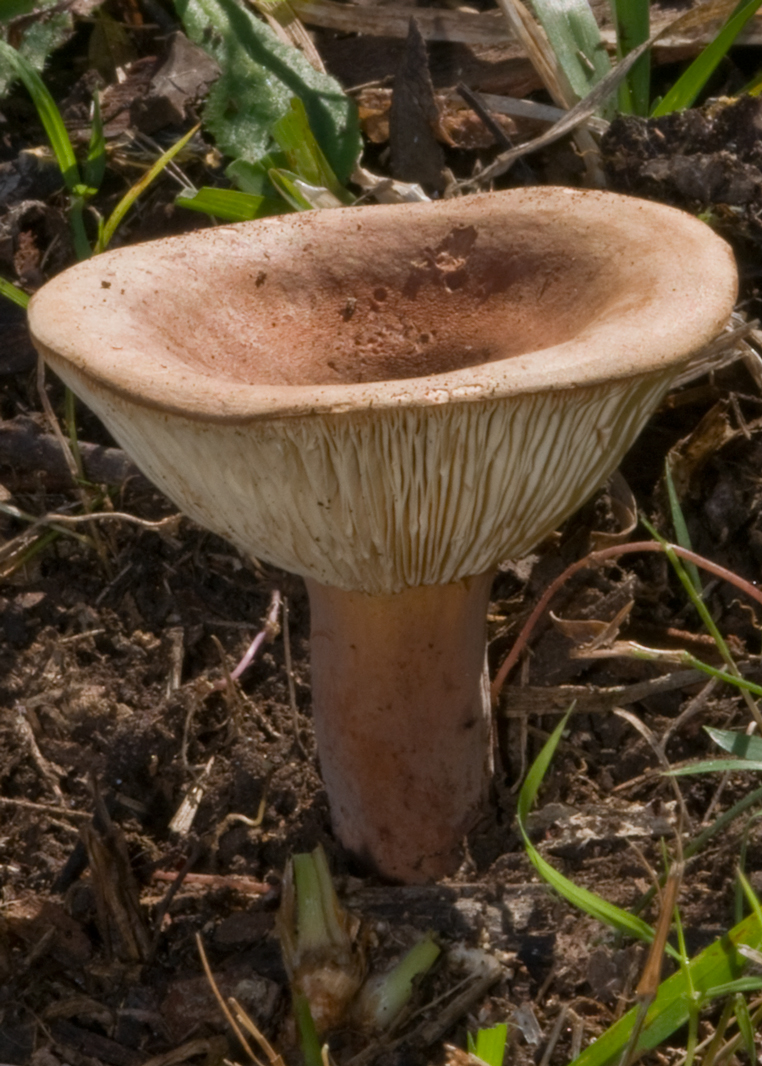
Lactifluus clarkeae

- Lactifluus albens T. Lebel, J. Douch & L. Vaughan
- Lactifluus aurantioruber (McNabb) J.A. Cooper
- Lactifluus clarkeae (Cleland) Verbeken 2012
- Lactifluus subclarkeae (Grgur.) Verbeken 2012
- Lactifluus flocktoniae (Cleland & Cheel) T. Lebel
- Lactifluus psammophilus T. Lebel, J. Douch & L. Vaughan
- Lactifluus pseudoflocktoniae T. Lebel, J. Douch, L. Tegart & L. Vaughan

Not assigned to a section

- Lactifluus foetens (Verbeken) Verbeken 2012

== Subgenus Pseudogymnocarpi ==
Lactifluus sect. Aurantiifolii (Verbeken) Verbeken 2012

- Lactifluus aurantiifolius (Verbeken) Verbeken 2012

Lactifluus sect. Polysphaerophori (Singer) Verbeken 2012

- Lactifluus pegleri
- Lactifluus veraecrucis (Singer) Verbeken 2012

Lactifluus sect. Pseudogymnocarpi (Verbeken) Verbeken 2012

- Lactifluus gymnocarpoides (Verbeken) Verbeken 2012
- Lactifluus longisporus (Verbeken) Verbeken 2012
- Lactifluus medusae (Verbeken) Verbeken 2012
- Lactifluus luteopus (Verbeken) Verbeken 2012
- Lactifluus pseudogymnocarpus (Verbeken) Verbeken 2012
- Lactifluus pumilus (Verbeken) Verbeken 2012
- Lactifluus pseudoluteopus (X.H.Wang & Verbeken) X.H.Wang 2012
- Lactifluus rugatus (Kühner & Romagn.) Verbeken 2012
- Lactifluus sudanicus Maba, Yorou & Guelly 2014

Lactifluus sect. Rubroviolascentini (Singer) Verbeken 2012

- Lactifluus carmineus (Verbeken & Walleyn) Verbeken 2012
- Lactifluus denigricans (Verbeken & Karhula) Verbeken 2012
- Lactifluus kigomaensis De Crop & Verbeken 2012
- Lactifluus rubroviolascens (R.Heim) Verbeken 2012

Lactifluus sect. Xerampelini

- Lactifluus goossensiae (Beeli) Verbeken 2012
- Lactifluus kivuensis (Verbeken) Verbeken 2012
- Lactifluus pseudovolemus (R.Heim) Verbeken 2012
- Lactifluus rubiginosus (Verbeken) Verbeken 2012
- Lactifluus xerampelinus (Karhula & Verbeken) Verbeken 2012

Not assigned to sections

- Lactifluus volemoides (Karhula) Verbeken 2012

== Unassigned species ==
- Lactifluus acrissimus (Verbeken & Van Rooij) Nuytinck 2016
- Lactifluus adustus (Rick) Delgat 2021
- Lactifluus albidopectinatus H. Lee & Y.W. Lim 2021
- Lactifluus albomembranaceus S. De Wilde & Van de Putte 2016
- Lactifluus albopicrus T. Lebel & L. Tegart 2020
- Lactifluus amazonensis (Singer) Silva-Filho & Wartchow 2019
- Lactifluus arcuatus (Murrill) Delgat 2019
- Lactifluus armeniacus De Crop & Verbeken 2016
- Lactifluus arsenei (R.Heim) Verbeken 2012
- Lactifluus angustus (R.Heim & Gooss.-Font.) Verbeken 2012
- Lactifluus annulatolongisporus (Maba) Maba 2015
- Lactifluus aurantiorugosus Sá & Wartchow 2013
- Lactifluus aurantiotinctus Kropp 2016
- Lactifluus auriculiformis Verbeken & F. Hampe 2018
- Lactifluus austropiperatus T. Lebel & L. Tegart 2020
- Lactifluus austrovolemus (Hongo) Verbeken 2012
- Lactifluus batistae Wartchow, J.L. Bezerra & M.A.Q. Cavalc. 2012
- Lactifluus betulicola H. Lee & Y.W. Lim 2021
- Lactifluus bhandaryi Verbeken & De Crop 2018
- Lactifluus brasiliensis (Singer) Silva-Filho & Wartchow 2019
- Lactifluus braunii (Rick) Silva-Filho & Wartchow 2019
- Lactifluus brunellus (S.L. Mill., Aime & T.W. Henkel) De Crop 2016
- Lactifluus brunneocarpus (Maba) Maba 2015
- Lactifluus burkinabei Maba 2015
- Lactifluus caatingae Sá & Wartchow 2019
- Lactifluus caeruleitinctus (Murrill) Delgat 2019
- Lactifluus caliendrifer Froyen & De Crop 2019
- Lactifluus caperatus (R.Heim & Gooss.-Font.) Verbeken 2012
- Lactifluus castaneibadius (Pegler) De Crop 2016
- Lactifluus castanopus (Sarnari) N. Schwab 2019
- Lactifluus catarinensis J. Duque, M.A. Neves & M. Jaegger 2020
- Lactifluus ceraceus Delgat & M. Roy 2017
- Lactifluus chiapanensis (Montoya, Bandala & Guzmán) De Crop 2016
- Lactifluus chrysocarpus E.S. Popov & O.V. Morozova 2013
- Lactifluus claricolor (R.Heim) Verbeken 2011
- Lactifluus coccolobae (O.K. Mill. & Lodge) Delgat 2020
- Lactifluus corbula (R.Heim & Gooss.-Font.) Verbeken 2011
- Lactifluus curvativus H. Lee & Y.W. Lim 2021
- Lactifluus dendriticus (T. Lebel) T. Lebel, J.A. Cooper & Nuytinck 2021
- Lactifluus dinghuensis J.B. Zhang, H.W. Huang & L.H. Qiu 2015
- Lactifluus dissitus Van de Putte, K. Das & Verbeken 2012
- Lactifluus domingensis Delgat & Angelini 2019
- Lactifluus dunensis Sá & Wartchow 2013
- Lactifluus echinatus (Thiers) De Crop 2021
- Lactifluus epitheliosus (Buyck & Courtec.) Delgat 2021
- Lactifluus fazaoensis Maba, Yorou & Guelly 2014
- Lactifluus flavellus Maba & Guelly 2015
- Lactifluus fuscomarginatus (Montoya, Bandala & I. Haug) Delgat 2020
- Lactifluus genevieveae (D. Stubbe & Verbeken) D. Stubbe, X.H. Wang & Verbeken 2012
- Lactifluus geoprofluens T. Lebel, Castellano, Claridge & Trappe 2021
- Lactifluus gerardiellus Wisitr. & Verbeken 2018
- Lactifluus guadeloupensis Delgat & Courtec. 2020
- Lactifluus guanensis Delgat & Lodge 2019
- Lactifluus guellyi Maba 2015
- Lactifluus guttulatus Silva-Filho, D.L. Komura & Wartchow 2021
- Lactifluus hallingii Delgat & De Wilde 2019
- Lactifluus holophyllus H. Lee & Y.W. Lim 2017
- Lactifluus ignifluus (K.B. Vrinda & C.K. Pradeep) De Crop 2021
- Lactifluus indicus K.N.A. Raj & Manim. 2016
- Lactifluus indovolemus I. Bera & K. Das 2019
- Lactifluus kanadii I. Bera, A. Ghosh, Nuytinck & Verbeken 2021
- Lactifluus koreanus H. Lee & Y.W. Lim 2021
- Lactifluus lactiglaucus P.L. Leonard & J. Dearnaley 2020
- Lactifluus leptomerus Van de Putte, K. Das & Verbeken 2012
- Lactifluus lepus Delgat & Courtec. 2020
- Lactifluus longibasidius Maba & Verbeken 2015
- Lactifluus longistipes H. Lee & Y.W. Lim 2021
- Lactifluus lorenae Montoya, Caro, A. Ramos & Bandala 2019
- Lactifluus luminosus H. Lee & Y.W. Lim 2021
- Lactifluus luteolamellatus H. Lee & Y.W. Lim 2017
- Lactifluus maenamensis K. Das, D. Chakr. & Buyck 2017
- Lactifluus mamorensis (Singer) Silva-Filho & Wartchow 2019
- Lactifluus marielleae J. Duque & M.A. Neves 2020
- Lactifluus marmoratus Delgat 2020
- Lactifluus melleus Maba 2015
- Lactifluus membranaceus (Maba) Maba 2015
- Lactifluus mexicanus Montoya, Caro, A. Ramos & Bandala 2019
- Lactifluus midnapurensis Paloi & K. Acharya 2019
- Lactifluus mordax (Thiers) Delgat 2019
- Lactifluus multiceps (S.L. Mill., Aime & T.W. Henkel) De Crop 2016
- Lactifluus multiseparatus H. Lee & Y.W. Lim 2021
- Lactifluus murinipes (Pegler) De Crop 2016
- Lactifluus nebulosus (Pegler) De Crop 2016)
- Lactifluus novoguineensis (Henn.) Verbeken 2012
- Lactifluus olivescens (Verbeken & E.Horak) Verbeken 2012
- Lactifluus orientivellereus H. Lee & Y.W. Lim 2021
- Lactifluus orientivolemus H. Lee & Y.W. Lim 2021
- Lactifluus paleus (Verbeken & E.Horak) Verbeken 2012
- Lactifluus pallidilamellatus (Montoya & Bandala) Van de Putte 2012
- Lactifluus pallidipes (Singer) Delgat 2021
- Lactifluus pallidotestaceus H. Lee & Y.W. Lim 2021
- Lactifluus panuoides (Singer) De Crop 2016
- Lactifluus paulensis (Singer) Delgat 2021
- Lactifluus pectinatus Maba & Yorou (2015)
- Lactifluus pegleri (Pacioni & Lalli) Delgat 2020
- Lactifluus pergamenus (Sw.) Kuntze 1891
- Lactifluus persicinus Delgat & De Crop 2017
- Lactifluus piperogalactus Silva-Filho, Sá & Wartchow 2021
- Lactifluus pisciodorus (R.Heim) Verbeken 2012 Verbeken 2012
- Lactifluus porphyreus H. Lee & Y.W. Lim 2021
- Lactifluus princeps (Berk.) Kuntze (1891)
- Lactifluus pseudotorminosus (R.Heim) Verbeken 2011
- Lactifluus pseudohygrophoroides H. Lee & Y.W. Lim 2017
- Lactifluus puberulus (H.A. Wen & J.Z. Ying) Nuytinck 2011 Nuytinck 2011
- Lactifluus pulchrellus F. Hampe & Wisitr. 2018
- Lactifluus quercicola H. Lee & Y.W. Lim 2021
- Lactifluus rajendrae P. Uniyal & K. Das 2016
- Lactifluus ramipilosus De Crop & Verbeken 2016
- Lactifluus raspei Verbeken & De Crop 2018
- Lactifluus robustus Yu Song, J.B. Zhang & L.H. Qiu 2017
- Lactifluus rufomarginatus (Verbeken & Van Rooij) De Crop 2016
- Lactifluus rugiformis H. Lee & Y.W. Lim 2021
- Lactifluus rupestris (Wartchow) Silva-Filho & Wartchow 2019
- Lactifluus russula (Rick) Silva-Filho & Wartchow 2019
- Lactifluus russulisporus Dierickx & De Crop 2019
- Lactifluus sainii Sam. Sharma & Atri 2018
- Lactifluus sinensis J.B. Zhang, Yu Song & L.H. Qiu 2017
- Lactifluus spathuliformis Silva-Filho, D.L. Komura & Wartchow 2021
- Lactifluus stellatus H. Lee & Y.W. Lim 2021
- Lactifluus subiculatus S.L.Mill., Aime & T.W.Henkel 2013
- Lactifluus subkigomaensis R. De Lange & De Crop 2017
- Lactifluus subpiperatus (Hongo) Verbeken 2012
- Lactifluus subpruinosus X.H. Wang 2015
- Lactifluus subquercicola H. Lee & Y.W. Lim 2021
- Lactifluus subreticulatus (Singer) Delgat 2021
- Lactifluus subviridilacteus H. Lee & Y.W. Lim 2021
- Lactifluus subvolemus Van de Putte & Verbeken 2015
- Lactifluus tropicosinicus X.H. Wang 2015
- Lactifluus uapacae (Verbeken & D. Stubbe) De Crop 2016
- Lactifluus umbilicatus Silva-Filho, D.L. Komura & Wartchow 2020
- Lactifluus umbonatus K.P.D. Latha & Manim. 2016
- Lactifluus undulatus H. Lee & Y.W. Lim 2021
- Lactifluus urens (Verbeken) Verbeken 2011
- Lactifluus venezuelanus (Dennis) De Crop 2016
- Lactifluus venosellus Silva-Filho, Sá & Wartchow 2020
- Lactifluus versiformis Van de Putte, K. Das & Verbeken 2012
- Lactifluus viridilacteus H. Lee & Y.W. Lim 2021
- Lactifluus wangii (J.Z. Ying & H.A. Wen) De Crop 2021
- Lactifluus khasianus D. Chakr., A. Ghosh & D. Tudu, 2025
