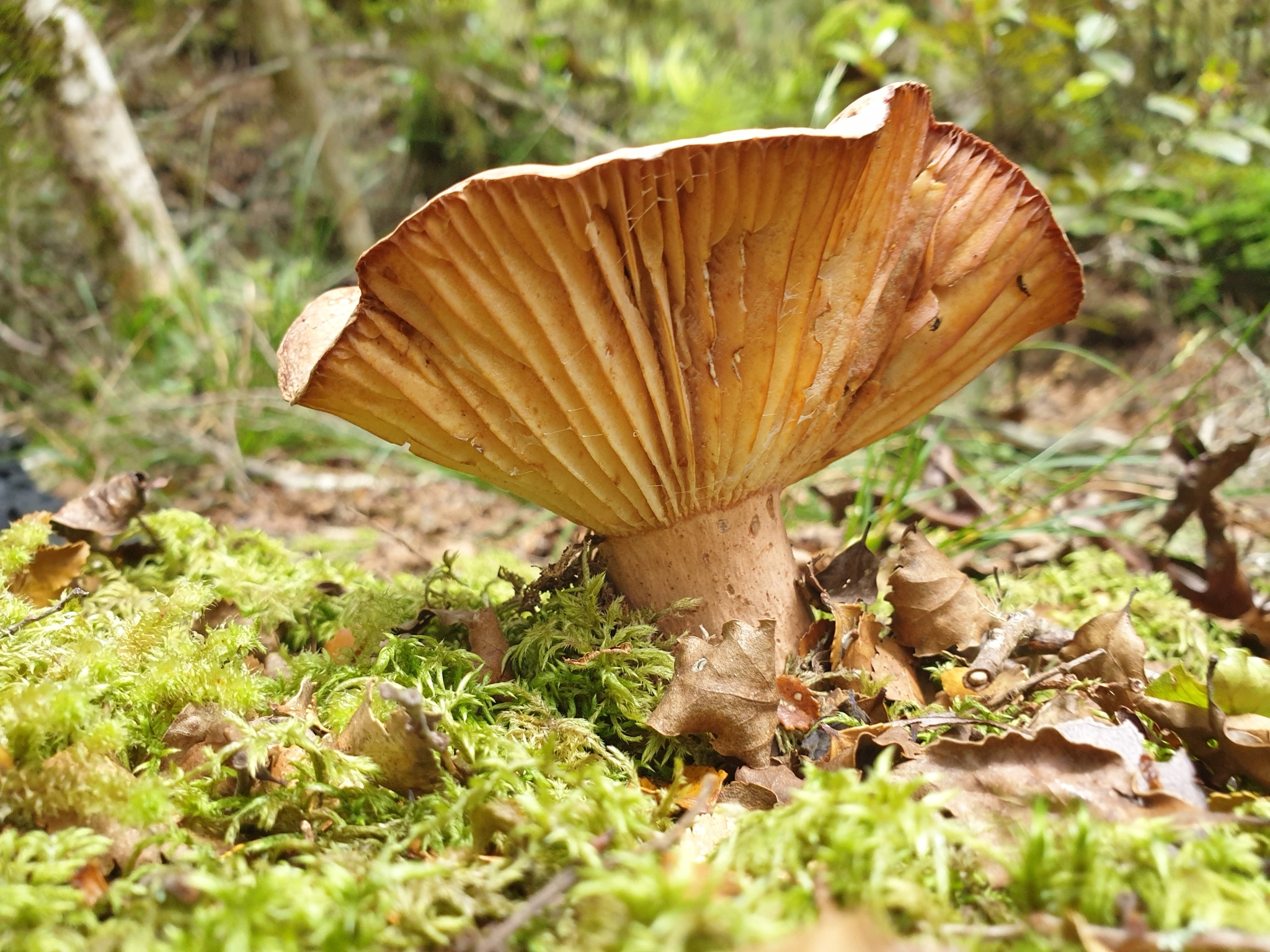

Scientific classification
- Domain: Eukaryota
- Kingdom: Fungi
- Division: Basidiomycota
- Class: Agaricomycetes
- Order: Russulales
- Family: Russulaceae
- Genus: Lactifluus
- Species: L. aurantioruber

Binomial name
- Lactifluus aurantioruber (McNabb) Cooper (2021)

Synonyms
- Lactifluus clarkeae var. aurantioruber McNabb

= Lactifluus aurantioruber =

Species of mushroom

Lactifluus aurantioruber Mycological characteristics
- Gills on hymenium
- Cap is convex
- Hymenium is adnate
- Stipe is bare
- Ecology is mycorrhizal
- Edibility is unknown

Lactifluus aurantioruber is a species of mushroom in the family Russulaceae. It originally described by McNabb as Lactifluus clarkeae var. aurantioruber in 1971, named for its reddish-orange colour. Jerry A. Cooper raised this variety to species-rank in 2021, thus acquiring the name Lactifluus aurantioruber. The type locality is Tongariro National Park, New Zealand.

== See also ==
- List of Lactifluus species
