= Lactifluus pseudoflocktoniae =

Scientific classification
- Domain: Eukaryota
- Kingdom: Fungi
- Division: Basidiomycota
- Class: Agaricomycetes
- Order: Russulales
- Family: Russulaceae
- Genus: Lactifluus
- Species: L. pseudoflocktoniae

Binomial name
- Lactifluus pseudoflocktoniae Lebel, Douch, Tegart & Vaughan (2021)

Species of mushroom

Lactifluus pseudoflocktoniae Mycological characteristics
- Gills on hymenium
- Cap is convex
- Hymenium is adnate or decurrent
- Stipe is bare
- Ecology is mycorrhizal
- Edibility is unknown

Lactifluus pseudoflocktoniae is a species of mushroom in the family Russulaceae. It was described by Teresa Lebel, James K. Douch, Lachlan Tegart, and Luke Vaughan in 2021. The specific epithet refers to Lactifluus flocktoniae, to which this species has a strong resemblance. The type locality is near Cann River, Australia.

== See also ==
- List of Lactifluus species
- Fungi of Australia
