= Lactifluus albens =

Scientific classification
- Domain: Eukaryota
- Kingdom: Fungi
- Division: Basidiomycota
- Class: Agaricomycetes
- Order: Russulales
- Family: Russulaceae
- Genus: Lactifluus
- Species: L. albens

Binomial name
- Lactifluus albens Lebel, Douch & Vaughan (2021)

Species of mushroom

Lactifluus albens Mycological characteristics
- Gills on hymenium
- Cap is convex
- Hymenium is adnate
- Stipe is bare
- Ecology is mycorrhizal
- Edibility is unknown

Lactifluus albens is a species of mushroom in the family Russulaceae. It was described by Teresa Lebel, James K. Douch, and Luke Vaughan in 2021. The specific epithet is Latin (bleached), named for the pale cream to buff colouration of basidiomata. The type locality is Dwellingup, Australia.

== See also ==
- List of Lactifluus species
- Fungi of Australia
