= Lactifluus jetiae =

Scientific classification
- Domain: Eukaryota
- Kingdom: Fungi
- Division: Basidiomycota
- Class: Agaricomycetes
- Order: Russulales
- Family: Russulaceae
- Genus: Lactifluus
- Species: L. jetiae

Binomial name
- Lactifluus jetiae Vaughan, Tegart, Douch & Lebel (2021)

Species of mushroom

Lactifluus jetiae Mycological characteristics
- Gills on hymenium
- Cap is convex
- Hymenium is decurrent
- Stipe is bare
- Ecology is mycorrhizal
- Edibility is unknown

Lactifluus jetiae is a species of mushroom-forming fungus in the family Russulaceae. It was described by Luke Vaughan, Lachlan Tegart, James K. Douch, and Teresa Lebel in 2021. The specific epithet is a Latinisation of the initials JET, in honour of Jennifer E. Tonkin, who had collected and preliminarily analysed many Australian members of the Russulaceae. The type locality is near the Cann River, Australia.

== See also ==
- List of Lactifluus species
- Fungi of Australia
