= Lactifluus pagodicystidiatus =

Scientific classification
- Domain: Eukaryota
- Kingdom: Fungi
- Division: Basidiomycota
- Class: Agaricomycetes
- Order: Russulales
- Family: Russulaceae
- Genus: Lactifluus
- Species: L. pagodicystidiatus

Binomial name
- Lactifluus pagodicystidiatus Vaughan, Tegart & Douch (2021)

Species of mushroom

Lactifluus pagodicystidiatus Mycological characteristics
- Gills on hymenium
- Cap is convex
- Hymenium is decurrent
- Stipe is bare
- Ecology is mycorrhizal
- Edibility is unknown

Lactifluus pagodicystidiatus is a species of mushroom in the family Russulaceae. It was described by Luke Vaughan, Lachlan Tegart, and James K. Douch in 2021. The specific epithet refers to the presence of some cystidia with shapes resembling a pagoda. The type locality is near the summit of Mount Jersey, Australia.

== See also ==
- List of Lactifluus species
- Fungi of Australia
