= Milk-cap =

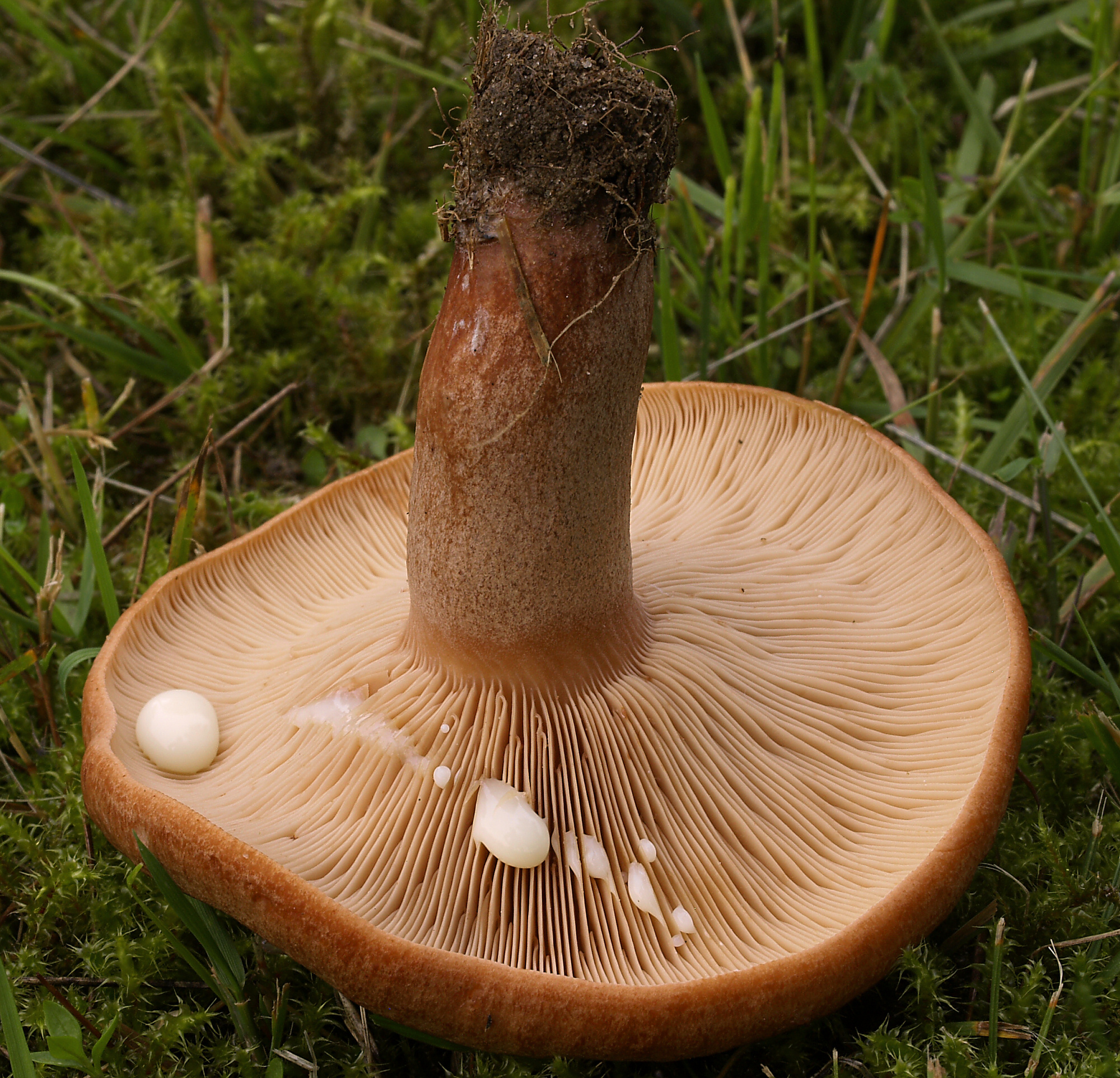
"Milk-caps" owe their name to the latex produced by their fruitbodies upon a cut (here Lactarius quietus).

Milk-cap (also milk cap, milkcap, or milky) is a common name that refers to mushroom-forming fungi of the genera Lactarius, Lactifluus, and Multifurca, all in the family Russulaceae. The common and eponymous feature of their fruitbodies is the latex ("milk") they exude when cut or bruised. Mushrooms with typical milk-cap characteristics are said to have a lactarioid habit. Some of them are edible.

Historically, these species were all united in the genus Lactarius, but molecular phylogenetic analysis has shown that they belong in fact to three distinct clades:

- Lactarius holds most of the milk-caps known from the Northern hemisphere.
- Lactifluus contains mainly tropical species, but also some well known northern milk-caps.
- Multifurca contains only one species exuding milk, M. furcata from North and Central America.

== Some prominent species ==
- Lactarius deliciosus - "saffron milk-cap" or "red pine mushroom"
- Lactarius deterrimus - "false saffron milk-cap"
- Lactarius indigo - "indigo milk-cap"
- Lactarius quietus - "oak milk-cap"
- Lactarius torminosus - "woolly milk-cap"
- Lactarius turpis - "ugly milk-cap"
- Lactifluus piperatus – "peppery milk-cap"
- Lactifluus vellereus – "fleecy milk-cap"
- Lactifluus volemus – "weeping milk-cap" or "voluminous-latex milky"

== See also ==
- List of Lactarius species
- List of Lactifluus species
