= Lactifluus rugulostipitatus =

Scientific classification
- Kingdom: Fungi
- Division: Basidiomycota
- Class: Agaricomycetes
- Order: Russulales
- Family: Russulaceae
- Genus: Lactifluus
- Species: L. rugulostipitatus

Binomial name
- Lactifluus rugulostipitatus Douch, Tegart, Vaughan & Lebel (2021)

Species of mushroom

Lactifluus rugulostipitatus Mycological characteristics
- Gills on hymenium
- Cap is convex
- Hymenium is decurrent
- Stipe is bare
- Ecology is mycorrhizal
- Edibility is unknown

Lactifluus rugulostipitatus is a species of mushroom in the family Russulaceae. It was described by James K. Douch, Lachlan Tegart, Luke Vaughan, and Teresa Lebel in 2021. The specific epithet refers to the longitudinally wrinkled stipe that is characteristic of this species. The type locality is near Mount Bundey, Australia.

== See also ==
- List of Lactifluus species
- Fungi of Australia
