= Lactifluus psammophilus =

Scientific classification
- Domain: Eukaryota
- Kingdom: Fungi
- Division: Basidiomycota
- Class: Agaricomycetes
- Order: Russulales
- Family: Russulaceae
- Genus: Lactifluus
- Species: L. psammophilus

Binomial name
- Lactifluus psammophilus Lebel, Douch & Vaughan (2021)

Species of mushroom

Lactifluus psammophilus Mycological characteristics
- Gills on hymenium
- Cap is convex
- Hymenium is adnate
- Stipe is bare
- Ecology is mycorrhizal
- Edibility is unknown

Lactifluus psammophilus is a species of mushroom in the family Russulaceae. It was described by Teresa Lebel, James K. Douch, and Luke Vaughan in 2021. The specific epithet is Latin (sand-loving), referring to this species' habitat. The type locality is Bunyip State Park, Australia.

== See also ==
- List of Lactifluus species
- Fungi of Australia
