= Lactifluus vitellinus =

Scientific classification
- Domain: Eukaryota
- Kingdom: Fungi
- Division: Basidiomycota
- Class: Agaricomycetes
- Order: Russulales
- Family: Russulaceae
- Genus: Lactifluus
- Species: L. vitellinus

Binomial name
- Lactifluus vitellinus (Van de Putte & Verbeken) Van de Putte (2012)

Synonyms
- Lactarius vitellinus Van de Putte & Verbeken (2010)

Species of fungus

Lactifluus vitellinus is a species of milk-cap mushroom in the order Russulales. Found in northern Thailand, it was described as new to science in 2010.
