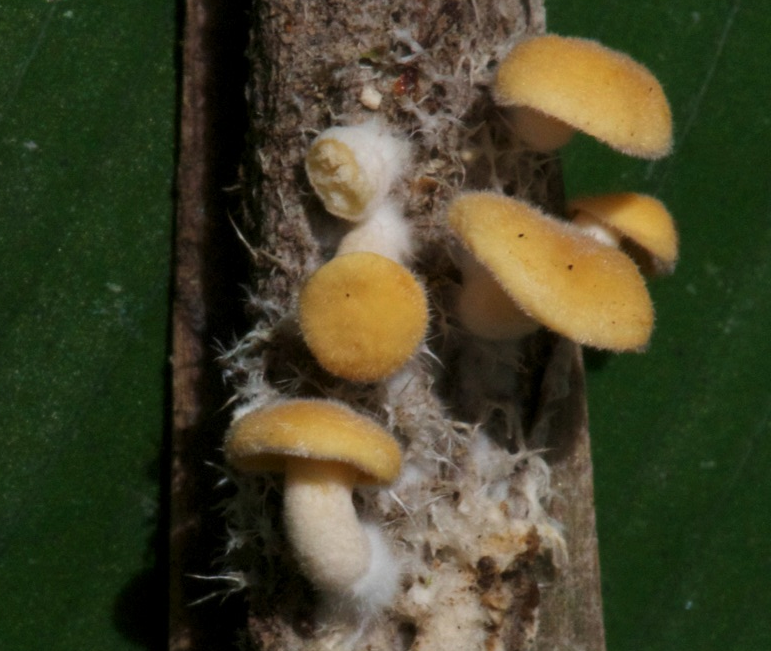

Scientific classification
- Kingdom: Fungi
- Division: Basidiomycota
- Class: Agaricomycetes
- Order: Russulales
- Family: Russulaceae
- Genus: Lactifluus
- Species: L. khasianus

Binomial name
- Lactifluus khasianus D. Chakr., A. Ghosh & D. Tudu, 2025

= Lactifluus khasianus =

Species of fungus

Lactifluus khasianus is a species of mushroom in the family Russulaceae, it was recently rediscovered in India. Originally described by C. H. Kauffman in 1932, it was later considered rare, with a lack of confirmed sightings for decades. The species can be found mainly in the subtropical and tropical forests of India, where it creates a distinct white milky latex when damaged.

Lactifluus khasianus plays a significant role in forest ecosystems and its rediscovery has brought attention to its ecological importance. The mushroom is still being studied by mycologists.
