= Lactifluus adustus =

Scientific classification
- Domain: Eukaryota
- Kingdom: Fungi
- Division: Basidiomycota
- Class: Agaricomycetes
- Order: Russulales
- Family: Russulaceae
- Genus: Lactifluus
- Species: L. adustus

Binomial name
- Lactifluus adustus (Rick) Delgat (2021)

Synonyms
- Lactarius adustus Rick (1938)

Species of fungus

Lactifluus adustus is a species of milk-cap fungus in the family Russulaceae. The species was first described in 1938 by Johannes Rick.
