= Lactifluus edulis =

Scientific classification
- Domain: Eukaryota
- Kingdom: Fungi
- Division: Basidiomycota
- Class: Agaricomycetes
- Order: Russulales
- Family: Russulaceae
- Genus: Lactifluus
- Species: L. edulis

Binomial name
- Lactifluus edulis (Verbeken & Buyck) Buyck (2011)

Synonyms
- Lactarius edulis Verbeken & Buyck (1994)

Species of fungus

Lactifluus edulis is a species of agaric fungus in the family Russulaceae. Described as new to science in 1994, it is found in Burundi.

== See also ==
- List of Lactifluus species
