= Lactifluus acrissimus =

Scientific classification
- Domain: Eukaryota
- Kingdom: Fungi
- Division: Basidiomycota
- Class: Agaricomycetes
- Order: Russulales
- Family: Russulaceae
- Genus: Lactifluus
- Species: L. acrissimus

Binomial name
- Lactifluus acrissimus (Verbeken & Van Rooij) Nuytinck (2016)

Synonyms
- Lactarius acrissimus Verbeken & Van Rooij, 2003

Species of fungus

Lactifluus acrissimus is a species of milk-cap fungus in the family Russulaceae. Found in Benin, the species was described in 2003. It is found in savanna woodlands.
