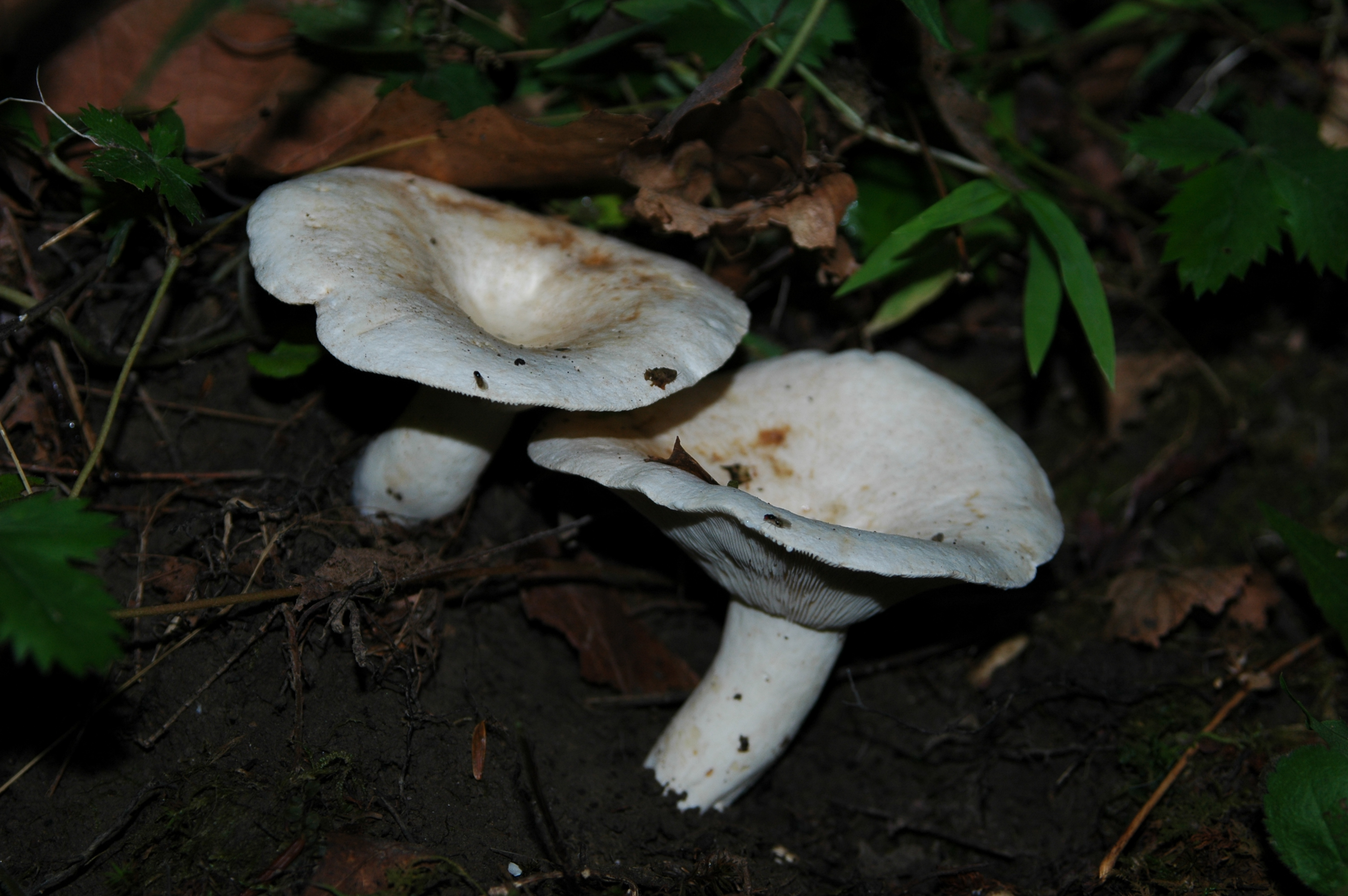

Scientific classification
- Kingdom: Fungi
- Division: Basidiomycota
- Class: Agaricomycetes
- Order: Russulales
- Family: Russulaceae
- Genus: Lactifluus
- Species: L. piperatus

Binomial name
- Lactifluus piperatus (L.) Roussel (1806)

Synonyms
- Agaricus piperatus L. (1753); Agaricus acris Bull. (1785); Agaricus lactifluus var. piperatus (L.) Pers. Lactaria piperata (L.) Pers. Lactarius piperatus (L.) Pers. (1797); Lactifluus piperatus (L.) O.Kuntze (1891)

= Lactifluus piperatus =

Species of fungus

Lactifluus piperatus
- Mycological characteristics
- Gills on hymenium
- Cap is convex
- Hymenium is decurrent
- Stipe is bare
- Spore print is white
- Ecology is mycorrhizal
- Edibility is edible but not recommended

Lactifluus piperatus (synonym Lactarius piperatus), commonly known as the blancaccio, is a basidiomycete fungus of the genus Lactifluus. It was the original type species of the genus Lactarius, before being moved to Lactifluus.

The fruiting body is a creamy-white mushroom which is funnel-shaped when mature, with exceptionally crowded gills. It bleeds a whitish peppery-tasting milk when cut. Widely distributed across Europe and eastern North America, L. piperatus has been accidentally introduced to Australia. Mycorrhizal, it forms a symbiotic relationship with various species of deciduous tree, including beech, and hazel, and fruiting bodies are found on the forest floor in deciduous woodland.

Despite often being considered edible, it reportedly contains toxins and has a poor flavor, but can be used as a seasoning when dried.

== Taxonomy ==
The species was one of many named by Carl Linnaeus, who officially described it in Volume Two of his Species Plantarum (1753) as Agaricus piperatus, the specific epithet deriving from the Latin adjective piperatus, meaning "peppery". For many years, Tyrolian naturalist Giovanni Antonio Scopoli was considered the author of the first description, until a 1987 revision of the International Code of Botanical Nomenclature began considering primary works describing fungi from as far back as 1753, instead of only 1821 (based on the work of Swedish naturalist Elias Magnus Fries).

Lactifluus piperatus was the original type species of the genus Lactarius. However, after the finding that Lactarius actually represented more than one genus, the species Lactarius torminosus was conserved as type for that genus. Thus, L. piperatus is now the type species of Lactifluus, which was split from Lactarius and contains mainly tropical milk-caps, but also some species of the north temperate zone. Phylogenetic research showed that L. glaucescens, sometimes considered only a variety of L. piperatus, is a distinct species in Europe. Furthermore, the existence of at least ten lineages worldwide, with no overlap among continents, was shown for the group around L. piperatus, suggesting that populations in North America might actually be distinct species.

It is commonly known as the peppery milk cap, pepper milkcap, peppery Lactarius, peppery milk mushroom, white peppery milk-cap, or other similar names. Similarly, in German it is known as the Pfeffermilchling ("pepper milk cap").

== Description ==
The cap is 6–16 centimetres (2 1/4–6 1/4 in) across, convex, and depressed in the center; it is creamy-white (staining tannish in age), glabrous but not glossy; it may crack in dry areas. The stipe is white in colour, smooth, 2–8 cm (1–3 in) long and 1–3 cm (1/2–1 1/4 in) thick, and cylindrical, sometimes tapering towards the base. There is a thick layer of firm white flesh, and the decurrent gills are particularly crowded and narrow, sharing the white colouration of the stem but becoming creamy with age. As with other species of Lactarius, there is abundant milk (latex), which is white, and dries olive-green. It has a white spore print with elongate, elliptic or amyloid spores which are ornamented, as with L. vellereus. The spores measure from 4.5–9.5 by 5–8 μm, are roundish to elliptical, and have tiny warts.

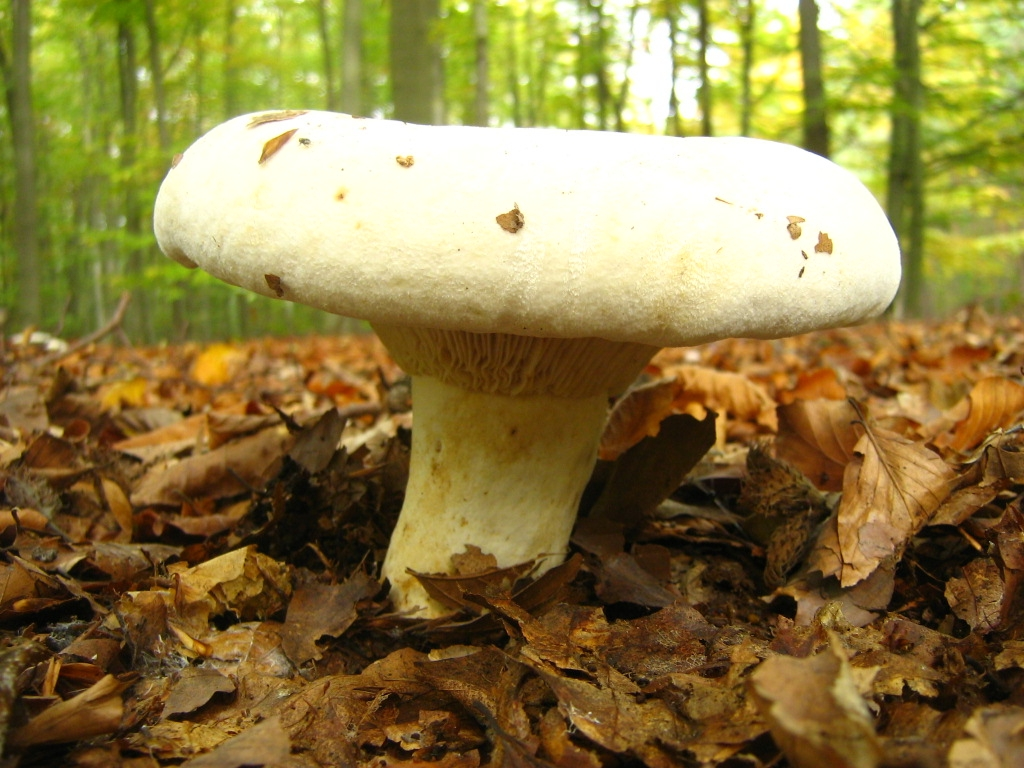
L. vellereus is similar but has a stouter stipe and a large, woolly cap.

=== Similar species ===
L. vellereus is larger with a thick stipe, woolly cap and less crowded gills, but is not as tall. Russula delica is similar in colour and shape, though has adnate blue-green tinged gills and no milk. L. deceptivus is also similar, but is differentiated by its less crowded gills, firmer cap margin and less acrid milk. Close to L. piperatus is L. glaucescens, which is differentiated by its milk that dries with a greenish colour.

== Distribution and habitat ==
Lactifluus piperatus in the wide sense, i.e. including probably several species, is found in Europe, the Black Sea region in northeastern Turkey, and eastern and central North America east of Minnesota. It has been accidentally introduced into Australasia, where it is found under introduced and native trees. It is found on the floor in deciduous woodland, particularly under beech (Fagus), and can be found throughout summer and autumn and into early winter. It is relatively common, though not as common as the similar L. vellereus. L. piperatus is found solitarily or in scattered groups. It is sometimes found growing together with Russula cyanoxantha.

== Ecology ==
It is a common food source for red squirrels. Adults of the pleasing fungus beetle Tritoma biguttata biguttata have been recorded from this mushroom, but it does not seem to be a regular food source for them; on the other hand, for the related T.angulata, L.piperatus seems to be by far the most important adult and larval food.

Significantly, L.piperatus is one of several species parasitized by Hypomyces lactifluorum (the lobster mushroom), which takes over the metabolism of its hosts, and in the case of L.piperatus thus stops the production of compounds toxic to humans, vastly increasing its edibility.

== Edibility ==
The species contains toxins, but despite being described by some authors as inedible or even poisonous, Lactifluus piperatus is often considered edible. It is not recommended by some owing simply to its unpleasant taste. It is difficult to digest when eaten raw, but is used as a seasoning when dried; it is also sometimes eaten fresh after parboiling, though its taste is still unappetising. Some recommend frying it in butter with bacon and onion, pickling it, or baking it in a pie or pastry. The milk has a very hot and acrid taste, which is removed if boiled. The mushroom used to be highly regarded in Russia, where it would be picked in dry seasons when other edible species were less available. The mushroom is also popular in Finland, where cooks boil it repeatedly (disposing of the water each time), and then store it in salt water and refrigerate it, then pickle it or serve it in salads. When eaten fresh and raw, the mushroom has been known to cause an irritant reaction on the lips and tongue, which subsides after an hour. The close L. glaucescens has been reported to be poisonous, but it has been speculated that the "poisonings" were caused by the extremely strong, peppery taste, rather than by the presence of actual poisons.

When parasitized by the lobster mushroom, L. piperatus forms part of an unusual and highly regarded dish in North America. Once colonized by the parasite, an orange-red crust forms over the surface of the mushroom, and the taste becomes delicious as the parasite infiltrates its host's tissues.

== Other uses ==
Because of the presence of auxins in L. piperatus metabolites, it can be applied as a rooting hormone to aid the growth of seedlings of various species of plants, including hazel, beech and oak. In the 19th century, it was used as a folk cure for tuberculosis, though it had no effect. In more recent times, it has been found that L. piperatus can be used as an antiviral agent, and the latex has been used against viral warts.

== See also ==
- List of Lactifluus species
