= Lactifluus austrovolemus =

Scientific classification
- Domain: Eukaryota
- Kingdom: Fungi
- Division: Basidiomycota
- Class: Agaricomycetes
- Order: Russulales
- Family: Russulaceae
- Genus: Lactifluus
- Species: L. austrovolemus

Binomial name
- Lactifluus austrovolemus Hongo Verbeken (2012)

Synonyms
- Lactarius austrovolemus Hongo (1973)

Species of fungus

Lactifluus austrovolemus is a species of milk-cap fungus in the family Russulaceae. It was first described scientifically by Japanese mycologist Tsuguo Hongo in 1973.
