= Lactifluus acicularis =

Scientific classification
- Domain: Eukaryota
- Kingdom: Fungi
- Division: Basidiomycota
- Class: Agaricomycetes
- Order: Russulales
- Family: Russulaceae
- Genus: Lactifluus
- Species: L. acicularis

Binomial name
- Lactifluus acicularis (Van de Putte & Verbeken) Van de Putte, (2012)

Synonyms
- Lactarius acicularis Van de Putte & Verbeken (2010)

Species of fungus

Lactifluus acicularis is a species of milk-cap fungus in the family Russulaceae. Described as new to science in 2010, the species is found in Chiang Mai Province of northern Thailand, where it grows in rainforests that are dominated by Castanopsis armata, Dipterocarpus sp. and Lithocarpus. The specific epithet, acicularis, is derived from Latin and means "needle-shaped".
