= Lactifluus heimii =

Scientific classification
- Domain: Eukaryota
- Kingdom: Fungi
- Division: Basidiomycota
- Class: Agaricomycetes
- Order: Russulales
- Family: Russulaceae
- Genus: Lactifluus
- Species: L. heimii

Binomial name
- Lactifluus heimii (Verbeken) Verbeken (2011)

Synonyms
- Lactarius heimii Verbeken (1996)

Species of fungus

Lactifluus heimii is a species of agaric fungus in the family Russulaceae. It is found in Burundi, where it grows in miombo woodland dominated by Bracystegia utilis.

== See also ==
- List of Lactifluus species
