= Lactifluus densifolius =

Scientific classification
- Domain: Eukaryota
- Kingdom: Fungi
- Division: Basidiomycota
- Class: Agaricomycetes
- Order: Russulales
- Family: Russulaceae
- Genus: Lactifluus
- Species: L. densifolius

Binomial name
- Lactifluus densifolius (Verbeken & Karhula) Verbeken (2011)

Synonyms
- Lactarius densifolius Verbeken & Karhula (1996)

Species of fungus

Lactifluus densifolius is a species of agaric fungus in the family Russulaceae. It is found in Zambia, where it grows in miombo woodland.

== See also ==
- List of Lactifluus species
