= Lactifluus aureifolius =

Scientific classification
- Domain: Eukaryota
- Kingdom: Fungi
- Division: Basidiomycota
- Class: Agaricomycetes
- Order: Russulales
- Family: Russulaceae
- Genus: Lactifluus
- Species: L. aureifolius

Binomial name
- Lactifluus aureifolius (Verbeken) Verbeken (2011)

Synonyms
- Lactarius aureifolius Verbeken (1996)

Species of fungus

Lactifluus aureifolius is a species of agaric fungus in the family Russulaceae. It is found in Burundi, which grows in miombo woodland dominated by Brachystegia utilis. The fungus was described in 1996 as a species of Lactarius.

== Taxonomy ==
The species was originally described as Lactarius aureifolius by Annameike Verbeken in 1996. She transferred the species to Lactifluus in 2011. It is classified in the subgenus Edules.

== Description ==
The fruit bodies have convex caps measuring 3–12 cm (1.2–4.7 in); the margins of the cap turn upward in maturity, resulting in a funnel shape. The stem measures 1.5–5.5 cm (0.6–2.2 in) long by 1.5–3.5 cm (0.6–1.4 in) thick. The distantly spaced gills have an adnate to somewhat decurrent attachment to the stem. Spores are ellipsoidal, measuring 6.7–7.6–8.6 by 5.7–6.3–6.9 μm.

== See also ==
- List of Lactifluus species
