= Lactifluus longipilus =

Scientific classification
- Domain: Eukaryota
- Kingdom: Fungi
- Division: Basidiomycota
- Class: Agaricomycetes
- Order: Russulales
- Family: Russulaceae
- Genus: Lactifluus
- Species: L. longipilus

Binomial name
- Lactifluus longipilus (Van de Putte, H.T. Le & Verbeken) Van de Putte (2012)

Synonyms
- Lactarius longipilus Van de Putte, Le & Verbeken (2010)

Species of fungus

Lactifluus longipilus is a species of milk-cap in the order Russulales. Found in Chiang Mai Province (northern Thailand), it was described as new to science in 2010. The mushrooms were found at an elevation of 1,300 metres (4,300 ft) growing in a forest dominated by Castanopsis spp., Lithocarpus sp., and Pinus kesiya.
