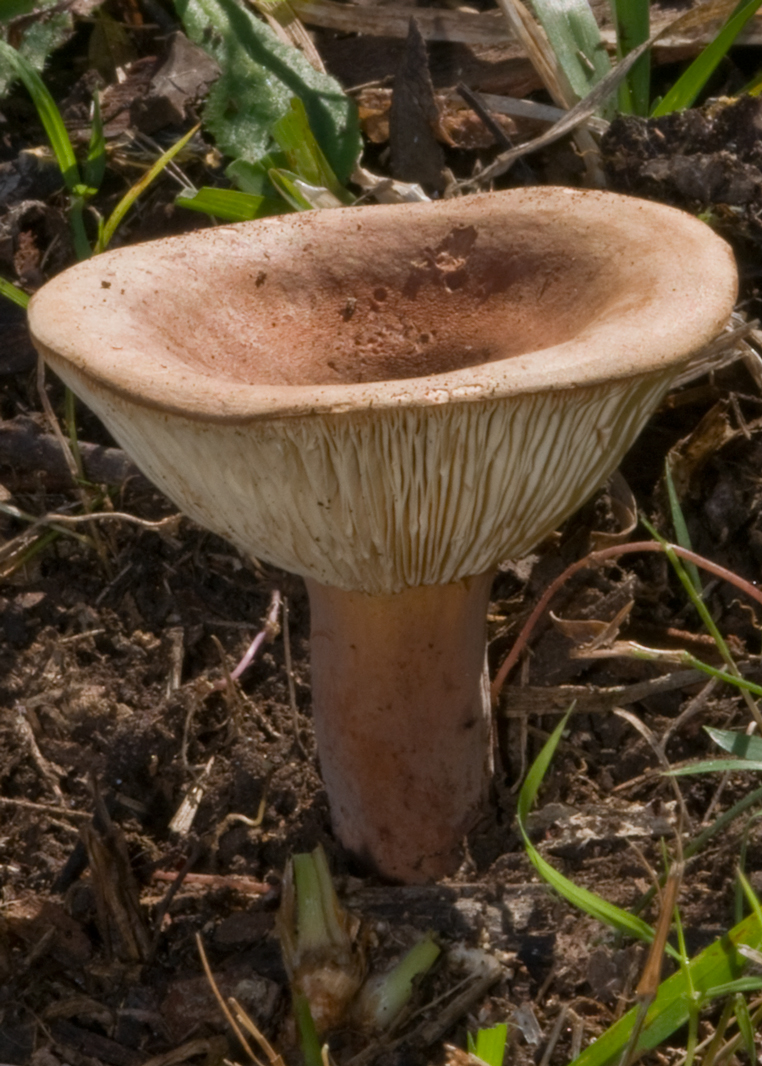

Scientific classification
- Kingdom: Fungi
- Division: Basidiomycota
- Class: Agaricomycetes
- Order: Russulales
- Family: Russulaceae
- Genus: Lactifluus
- Species: L. clarkeae

Binomial name
- Lactifluus clarkeae (Cleland) Verbeken (2012)

Synonyms
- Lactarius clarkeae Cleland 1927; Lactarius clarkei Cleland 1927

= Lactifluus clarkeae =

Species of fungus

Lactifluus clarkeae
- Mycological characteristics
- Gills on hymenium
- Cap is convex or infundibuliform
- Hymenium is adnate or decurrent
- Stipe is bare
- Spore print is white
- Ecology is mycorrhizal
- Edibility is unknown

Lactifluus clarkeae, formerly known as Lactarius clarkeae, is a species of mushroom-forming fungus in the family Russulaceae. It is found in Australia and New Zealand in mycorrhizal association with species of Nothofagus and the family Myrtaceae.

== Taxonomy and naming ==
Lactifluus clarkeae was first described as a species of Lactarius in 1927 by Australian naturalist John Burton Cleland from a specimen found at Mount Lofty, South Australia. Cleland noted the mushroom was similar in general appearance to Russula flocktoniae, now Lactifluus flocktoniae. It was named in honour of botanical artist Phyllis Flockton Clarke, notable for her watercolour paintings of the fungi of New South Wales and niece of fellow botanical artist, Margaret Flockton. Lactifluus flocktoniae is generally understood to have a brighter orange to red cap and paler gills compared to Lactifluus clarkeae, which has variable morphology.

Both species were transferred to the genus Lactifluus in 2012 on the basis of phylogenetic analysis of DNA sequences and a review of ecological and morphological characteristics. No synapomorphic features have been identified that unambiguously distinguish Lactifluus and Lactarius, but habitat and mycorrhizal association are important in identification of species. Microscopically, sphaerocysts in lamellae trama and thick-walled elements in the pileipellis and stipitipellis (stipe cuticle) are common in Lactifluus but rare in Lactarius.

In 2017, Lactifluus clarkeae was classified in Lactifluus subgenus Gymnocarpi section Tomentosi.

=== Species complex ===
The species boundaries of Lactifluus clarkeae were poorly understood. Mushrooms of similar appearance found in Australia and New Zealand have been alternately named Russula flocktoniae, Lactarius subclarkeae, Lactarius clarkeae and most recently Lactifluus clarkeae. In 2021, a review of existing specimens classified as Lactifluus clarkeae, Russula flocktoniae, Lactarius subclarkeae found specimens belonging to eleven clades within the genus Lactifluus and one clade of the genera Russula. In addition, the study identified six new species and elevated one previously known subspecies to species status.

== Description ==
=== Macromorphology ===
Like other members of Russulaceae, fruit-bodies of Lactifluus clarkeae have brittle flesh and, like other species of Lactarius and Lactifluus, produce latex when bruised. The production of latex can be an ephemeral feature, particularly in dry conditions. The species concept is broad, the morphology is variable and loosely defined.

It is a robust mushroom with a pale buff to bright-orange pileus, 50–120 mm in diameter, can be convex at first and often centrally depressed, becoming infundibuliform or funnel-shaped with age. The cap surface is dry, smooth to velutinous or tomentose, with an inrolled margin. The outline of the cap sometimes irregular, giving a warped appearance. The pileus context or flesh is white or cream through to orange in fresh specimens and can stain brown on exposure to air, up to 30 mm deep. The lamellae are adnate to decurrent, close to sub-distant, thick, up to 8 mm deep, typically lighter-coloured buff than the cap and stem, and bruise brownish. The stipe is up to 41 mm tall and 30 mm in diameter, terete, almost equal but often tapering slightly towards the base, concolorous with the cap or not, finely velutinous to tomentose. Context of the stem is solid and occasionally with chambers, similar colour to the cap context. Latex is white, cream, or watery but often variable. Odour can be mild or acrid or fishy in fresh specimens and acrid or fishy on drying. Taste can be mild, hot, acrid or astringent.

=== Micromorphology ===
Basidiospores 8 μm and slightly angular according to Cleland's original description. Spore print white.

=== Similar species ===
The boundaries between Lactifluus clarkeae and Lactifluus flocktoniae are poorly defined and the morphological variability alone indicates the presence of several similar unique species that are yet to be described. Macromorphologically close mushroom species from similar habitats include Lactifluus wirrabara, which can also be found in Eucalypt forests or woodlands but usually has a chocolate brown pileus and stipe. There are several similar species found in other parts of the world, as Lactifluus has its main distribution in the tropics of the Southern Hemisphere. Of particular similarity are species in the subgenus Gymnocarpi section Tomentosi. McNabb noted the similarity of Lactifluus clarkeae to L. rubroviolascens from Madagascar and erected the new section Tomentosi for these two species.

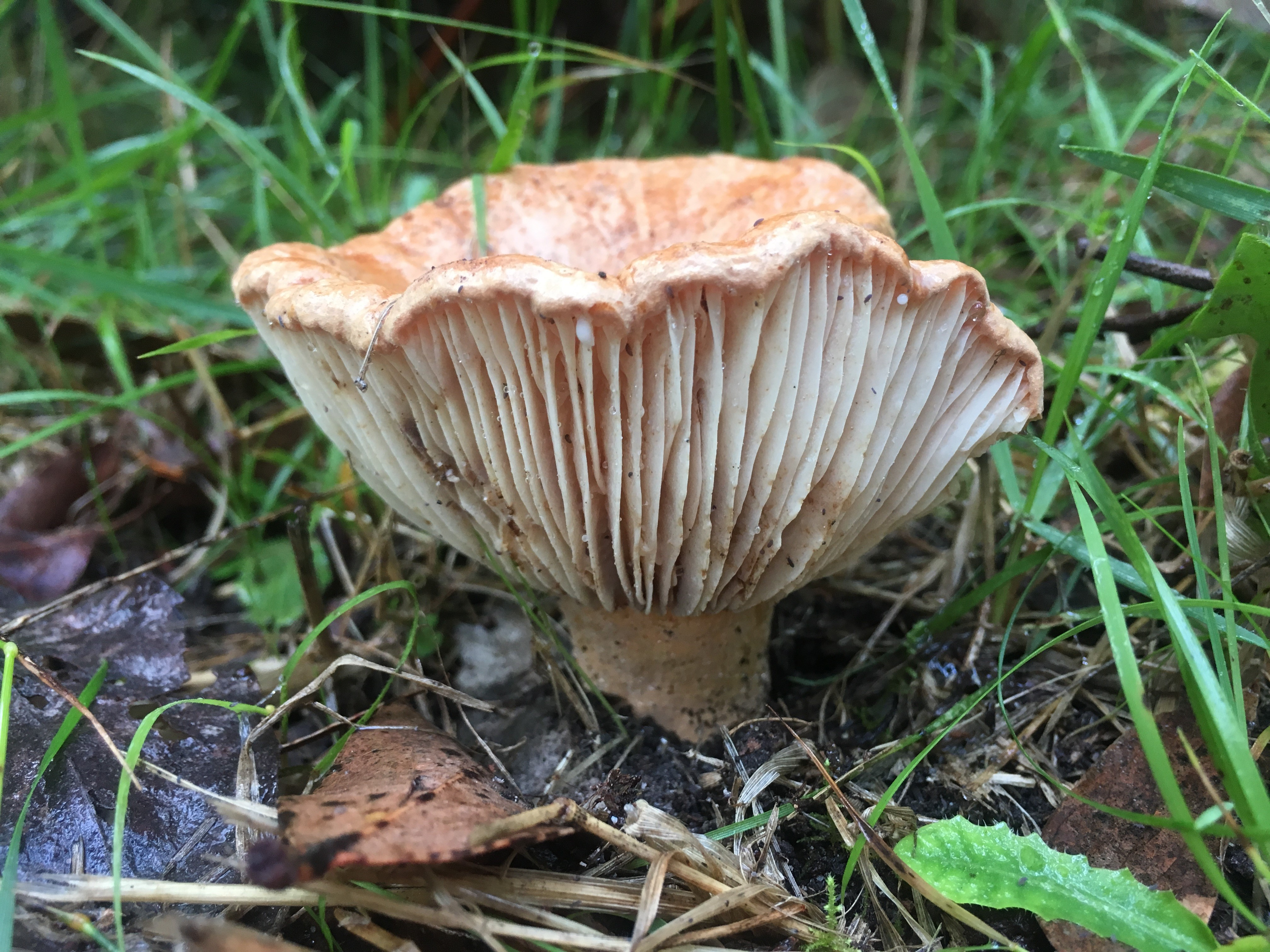
Lactifluus clarkeae from Greens Bush, Mornington Peninsula National Park, Victoria

== Ecology, distribution, and habitat ==
Lactifluus clarkeae occurs in Australia and New Zealand and is commonly observed in forests and woodlands with shrubs and trees including Eucalyptus and Leptospermum of Myrtaceae and also with Nothofagus.

In New Zealand, L. clarkeae var. clarkeae is used to describe mushrooms of this appearance found under Leptospermum, whereas L. aurantioruber (formerly L. clarkeae var. aurantioruber) is used for mushrooms found associated with Nothofagus (southern beech).

== Edibility ==
Like many Australian mushrooms, the edibility and palatability of this mushroom is fairly unknown. However, Lactifluus volemus is a Northern Hemisphere species with some documented culinary usage.

A. M. Young's A Field Guide to the Fungi of Australia mentions Lactifluus clarkeae as a food for the land mullet, an Australian skink known to eat fungi.

Fruit-bodies seen in Greens Bush show evidence of fungivory by local fauna, including slugs and probably swamp wallaby or eastern grey kangaroo.
