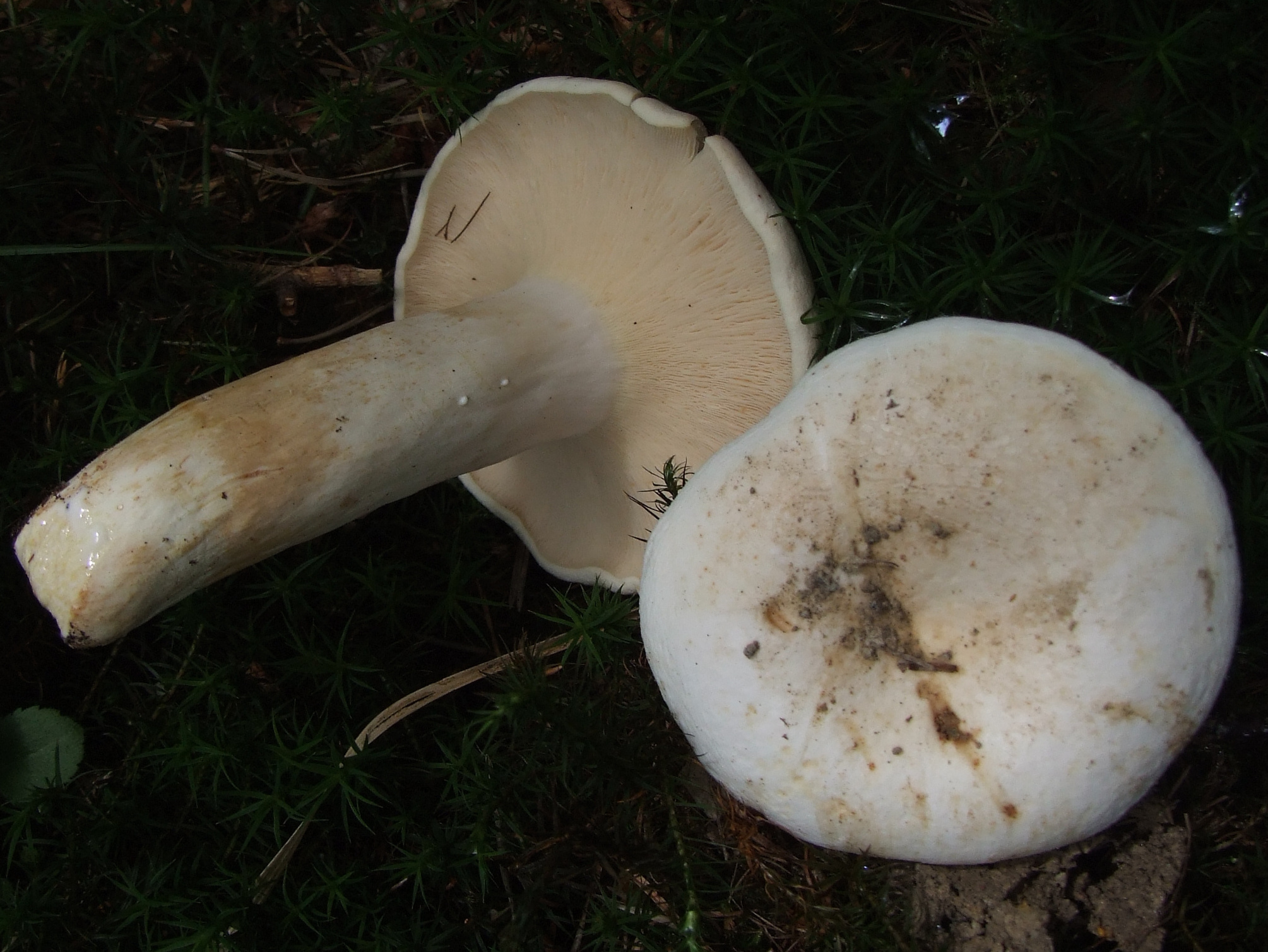
- Lactifluus piperatus

Scientific classification
- Kingdom: Fungi
- Division: Basidiomycota
- Class: Agaricomycetes
- Order: Russulales
- Family: Russulaceae
- Genus: Lactifluus (Pers.) Roussel (1806)

Type species
- Lactifluus piperatus (L.) Roussel (1806)

Species
- List of Lactifluus species

Diversity
- 253 species

= Lactifluus =

Genus of fungi

Lactifluus is one of three genera of mushroom-forming fungi containing species commonly named "milk-caps", the others being Lactarius and Multifurca. It has been separated from Lactarius based on molecular phylogenetic evidence but is very similar to that genus. There are roughly 150 known Lactifluus species, which have a mainly tropical distribution but are also found in the north temperate zone and Australasia. Some of them are edible mushrooms.

== Taxonomy ==
- - - Lactarius
    - Multifurca
  - Russula
- Lactifluus

Phylogenetic relationships of Lactarius, Lactifluus, Multifurca, and Russula.

The genus Lactifluus was described in 1806 by French naturalist Henri François Anne de Roussel, with the type species Lactifluus piperatus. Later, Lactifluus was largely considered a synonym of Lactarius, until molecular phylogenetic work showed in 2008 that Lactarius was not a monophyletic group. In the following, the name Lactarius was conserved for the biggest of the subclades revealed, containing most well-known north temperate species. Thus, the name Lactifluus could be used for the smaller genus, necessitating only a few name changes, as combinations with Lactifluus had already been made previously for many temperate species. New combinations have since been proposed for several species formerly classified in Lactarius. A phylogenetics-based revision in 2017 divided the genus in four subgenera: Lactifluus, Lactariopsis, Gymnocarpi and Pseudogymnocarpi. They are further subdivided into section, but not all species are assigned to named sections. Many of these new groups do not correspond to previous subdivisions based mainly on morphology.

=== Selected species ===
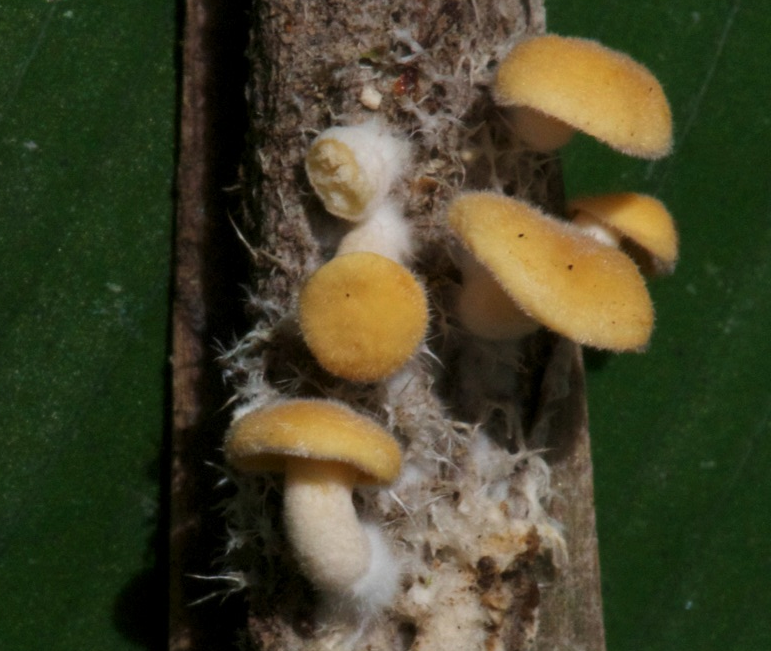
Pleurotoid Lactifluus are mainly found in the Tropics: here, an unidentified species from French Guiana.

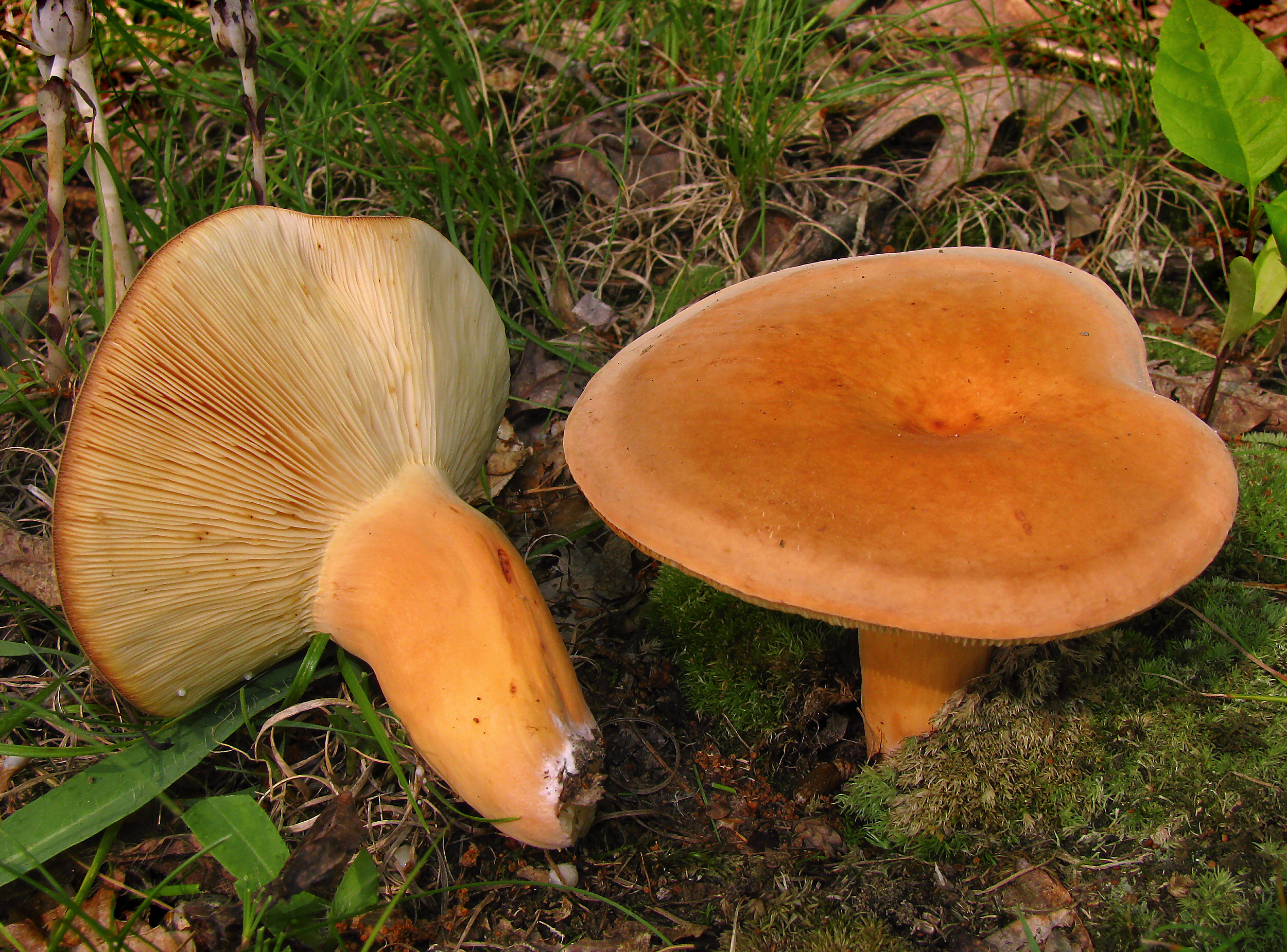
L. volemus is one of the best known edible milk-caps.

As of 2021, there are roughly 150 described species, classified in four subgenera. Some notable species are listed below under their respective subgenera.

- Subgenus Lactifluus

- Lactifluus corrugis – 'corrugated-cap milky' (North America)
- Lactifluus piperatus – 'peppery milk-cap' (Europe and North America)
- Lactifluus volemus – 'weeping milk-cap' or 'voluminous-latex milky' (North and Central America, Europe, Asia)

- Subgenus Lactariopsis

- Lactifluus aureifolius (tropical Africa)
- Lactifluus deceptivus – 'deceiving milk-cap' (North and Central America)
- Lactifluus densifolius (tropical Africa)
- Lactifluus edulis (tropical Africa)
- Lactifluus heimii (tropical Africa)
- Lactifluus vellereus – 'fleecy milk-cap' (Europe)

- Subgenus Gymnocarpi

- Lactifluus clarkeae (Australia and New Zealand)

- Subgenus Pseudogymnocarpi

- Lactifluus hygrophoroides (North America)

== Description ==
Lactifluus closely resembles its lookalike genus Lactarius, with whom it shares the brittle flesh of the fruit bodies and the milk-like latex exuded when bruised. So far, synapomorphic characters for the genus have not been discovered, there are only tendencies that distinguish it from Lactarius. Pleurotoid (laterally stiped) fruitbodies are only known in Lactifluus, while species with closed (angiocarpous) fruitbodies only occur in Lactarius. Microscopically, thick-walled elements in the pileipellis and stipitipellis (cuticle of the stipe) and sphaerocytes in the trama of the lamellae are common in Lactifluus, but rare in Lactarius species.

== Edibility ==
Several species in the genus are edible. Lactifluus volemus especially is a choice mushroom in the northern temperate region.
