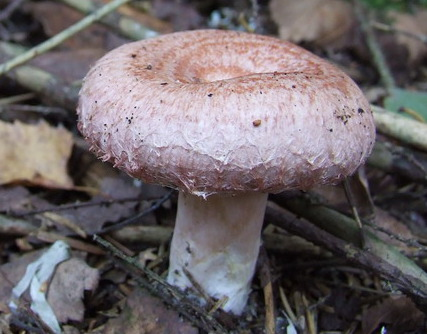

Scientific classification
- Kingdom: Fungi
- Division: Basidiomycota
- Class: Agaricomycetes
- Order: Russulales
- Family: Russulaceae
- Genus: Lactarius
- Species: L. torminosus

Binomial name
- Lactarius torminosus (Schaeff.) Gray (1821)

Synonyms
- List: Agaricus torminosus Schaeff. (1774); Galorrheus torminosus (Schaeff.) P.Kumm. (1871); Lactifluus torminosus (Schaeff.) Kuntze (1891); Agaricus intermedius sensu Krombholz (1887); Lactarius intermedius sensu Krombholz (1887); Agaricus cilicioides Fr. (1821); Lactarius cilicioides (Fr.) Fr. (1838); Galorrheus cilicioides (Fr.) P. Kumm. (1871); Lactarius torminosus var. cilicioides (Fr.) Quél. (1886); Lactifluus cilicioides (Fr.) Kuntze (1891); Lactarius torminosus subsp. cilicioides (Fr.) Konrad & Maubl. (1935); Lactarius intermedius Krombh. ex Berk. & Broome (1881); Lactarius cilicioides var. albus Peck (1885); Lactarius cilicioides subsp. intermedius Krombh. ex Sacc. (1887); Lactifluus intermedius Krombh. ex Kuntze (1891); Lactarius citriolens var. intermedius (Krombh. ex Kuntze) Krieglst. (1999); Lactarius torminosus f. albida Killerm. (1933); Lactarius torminosus var. gracillimus J.E. Lange (1938); Lactarius torminosus var. gracillimus J.E. Lange (1940); Lactarius torminosus var. typicus Kühner & Romagn. (1953); Lactarius torminosus var. sublateritius Kühner & Romagn. (1954); Lactarius nordmanensis A.H. Sm. (1960); Lactarius torminosus var. nordmanensis (A.H. Sm.) Hesler & A.H. Sm. (1979)

= Lactarius torminosus =

Species of fungus

Lactarius torminosus
- Mycological characteristics
- Gills on hymenium
- Cap is convex or depressed
- Hymenium is decurrent
- Stipe is bare
- Spore print is cream to yellow
- Ecology is mycorrhizal
- Edibility is poisonous

Lactarius torminosus, commonly known as the woolly milkcap or the bearded milkcap, is a large species of agaric fungus. It was first described scientifically by Jacob Christian Schäffer in 1774 as an Agaricus, and later transferred to the genus Lactarius in 1821 by Samuel Frederick Gray. L. torminosus officially became the type species of Lactarius in 2011 after molecular studies prompted the taxonomic reshuffling of species between several Russulaceae genera.

The caps are convex with a central depression, and attain a diameter of up to 10 cm (4 in). A blend of pink and ochre hues, the cap sometimes has concentric zones of alternating lighter and darker shades. The edge of the cap is rolled inward, and shaggy when young. On the underside of the cap are narrow flesh-colored gills that are crowded closely together. The cylindrical stem is a pale flesh color with a delicately downy surface and brittle flesh; it is up to 8 cm (3 in) long and 0.6–2 cm (1/4–3/4 in) thick. When cut or injured, the fruit bodies ooze a bitter white latex that does not change color upon exposure to air. The variety nordmanensis, in contrast, has latex that changes from white to yellow. Similar species like L. pubescens or L. villosus differ in morphology and coloration, as well as microscopic characteristics like spore shape and size.

A common and widely distributed species, L. torminosus mushrooms form on the ground singly or in groups in mixed forests of both the Old World and North America. A mycorrhizal species, it associates with various trees, most commonly birch. The species is highly irritating to the digestive system when eaten raw. The toxins, also responsible for the strongly bitter or acrid taste, are destroyed by cooking. It is valued for its peppery flavor and eaten in Russia and Finland. Studies have identified several chemicals present in the mushrooms, including ergosterol and derivatives thereof, and the pungent-tasting velleral.

== Taxonomy ==
German naturalist Jacob Christian Schäffer was the first to describe the species, placing it in the genus Agaricus in 1774. Seven years later in 1781, Jean Bulliard described a species he called Agaricus necator and illustrated it in the first volume of his Herbier de la France; this name and the synonym Lactarius necator, resulting from Christian Hendrik Persoon's 1800 transfer to Lactarius, are both considered to refer to L. torminosus. Otto Kuntze, for his part chose to put it in Lactifluus, while Paul Kummer thought Galorrheus was the appropriate placement; until the recent resurrection of Lactifluus, both genera had been long considered to be unnecessary segregates of Lactarius. According to Index Fungorum, another synonym is Samuel Frederick Gray's Lactarius necans. Gray also gave the species its modern name when he transferred it to Lactarius in his 1821 Natural Arrangement of British Plants.

According to Hesler and Smith's 1979 classification of the genus Lactarius, L. torminosus belongs to subgenus Piperites, section Piperites (in which it is the type species), subsection Piperites. Species in this subsection are characterized by having latex that does not turn yellow after exposure to air, and/or that does not stain the cut surface of the mushroom surface yellow. A 2004 phylogenetic analysis of European Lactarius species concluded that L. torminosus falls into a group that includes L. torminosulus, and that these two species are closely related to a group that includes L. tesquorum, L. scoticus, and L. pubescens.

A multi-gene molecular analysis published in 2008 demonstrated that species then distributed in the genera Lactarius and Russula actually consisted of four distinct lineages. The subsequent reorganization of Russulaceae species—a taxonomic change needed to make Russula and Lactarius monophyletic—required that a new type species be defined for Lactarius, since the previous type, L. piperatus, belonged to the clade that will be transferred to genus Lactifluus. A proposal to conserve Lactarius with L. torminosus as the type was accepted by the Nomenclatural Committee for Fungi and passed at the 2011 International Botanical Congress. The change minimizes "taxonomic disruption", allowing most of the common and well-known Lactarius species to retain their names.

=== Etymology ===
The specific epithet torminosus means "tormenting" or "causing colic", in reference to the gastrointestinal distress associated with consuming the raw mushroom. Early English vernacular names were Gray's "bellyach milk-stool" (1821), and James Edward Smith's "bearded pepper agaric" (1824). More recent common names include "shaggy milkcap", "powderpuff milkcap", "pink-fringed milkcap", "bearded milkcap", and the British Mycological Society-recommended "woolly milkcap".

== Description ==
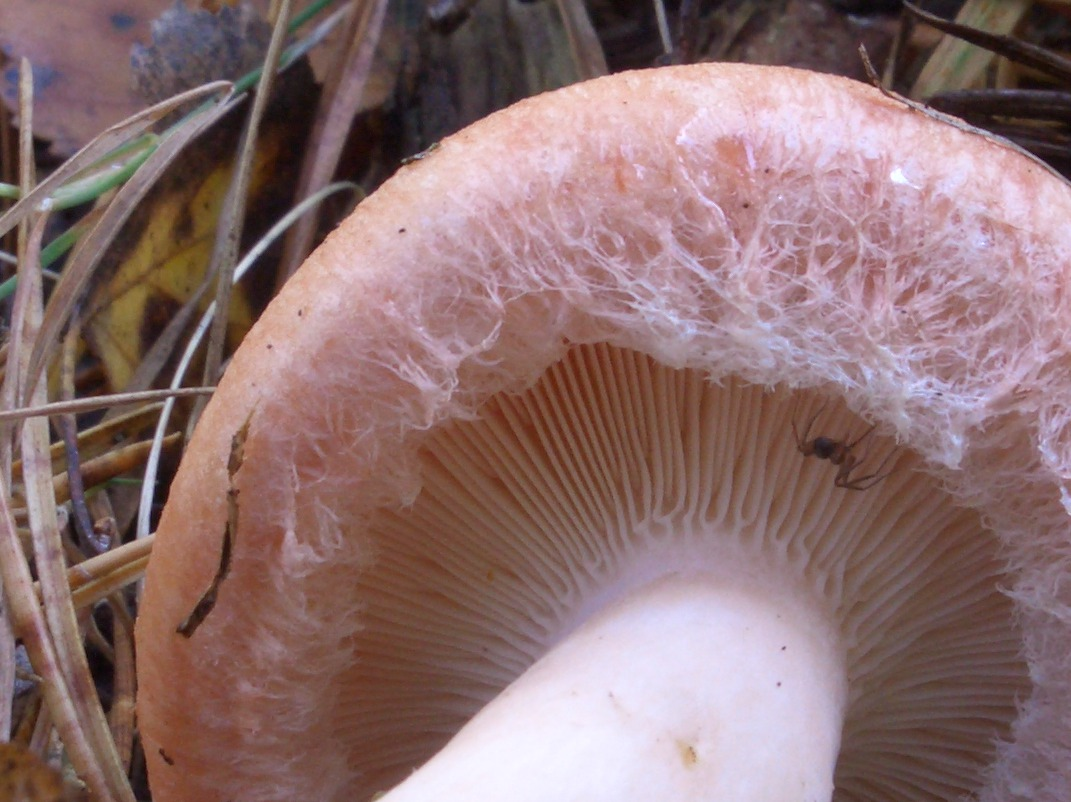
Young fruit body showing the tomentose cap margin and forked gills

The cap is initially convex, but as it matures the center forms a depression and the outer edges rise until it assumes the shape of a shallow funnel; its final width is typically between 2 and 12 cm (3/4 and 4 3/4 in). The cap margin is strongly curled inward; when young, it is tomentose (covered with a thick matting of hairs), forming a veil-like structure that partly covers up the gills. This tomentum diminishes with age. The cap surface is at first similarly tomentose, but eventually, the hairs wear off, leaving the surface more or less smooth. The surface starts off somewhat sticky with clear concentric rings of darker shade (a zonate pattern); these rings, especially the outer ones, usually fade in maturity. The cap color is pinkish-orange to pale dull pink, becoming orange to whitish toward the margin as the pink gradually fades. The white to flesh-colored flesh is firm and brittle, but becomes flaccid in age. The latex that is produced when the mushroom tissue is cut or injured is white to cream, and does not change color with prolonged exposure to air, nor does it stain the gills. It has an acrid taste, with a slight to pungent odor.

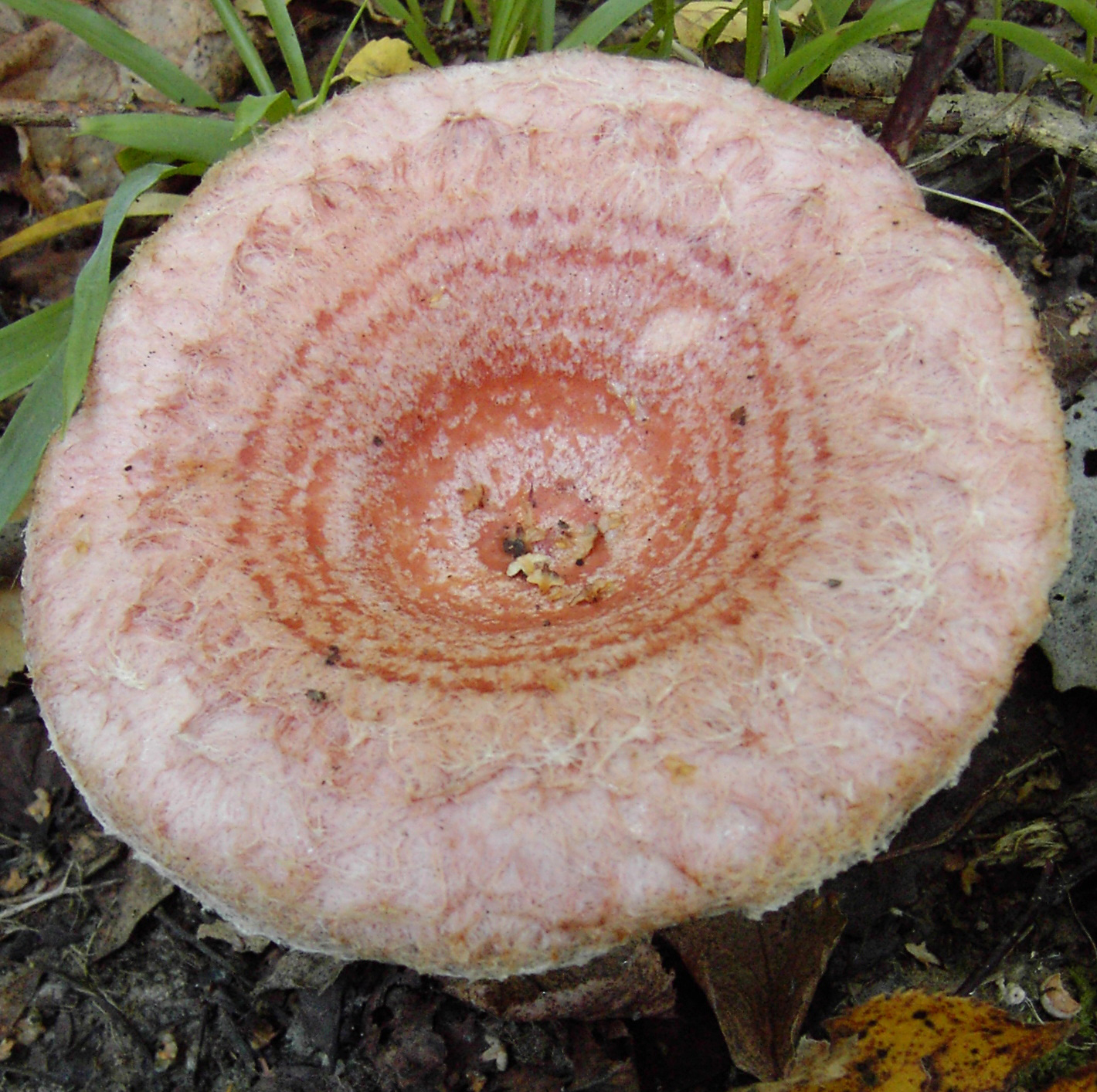
The cap surface is typically zonate (marked by concentric colored bands) in young specimens.

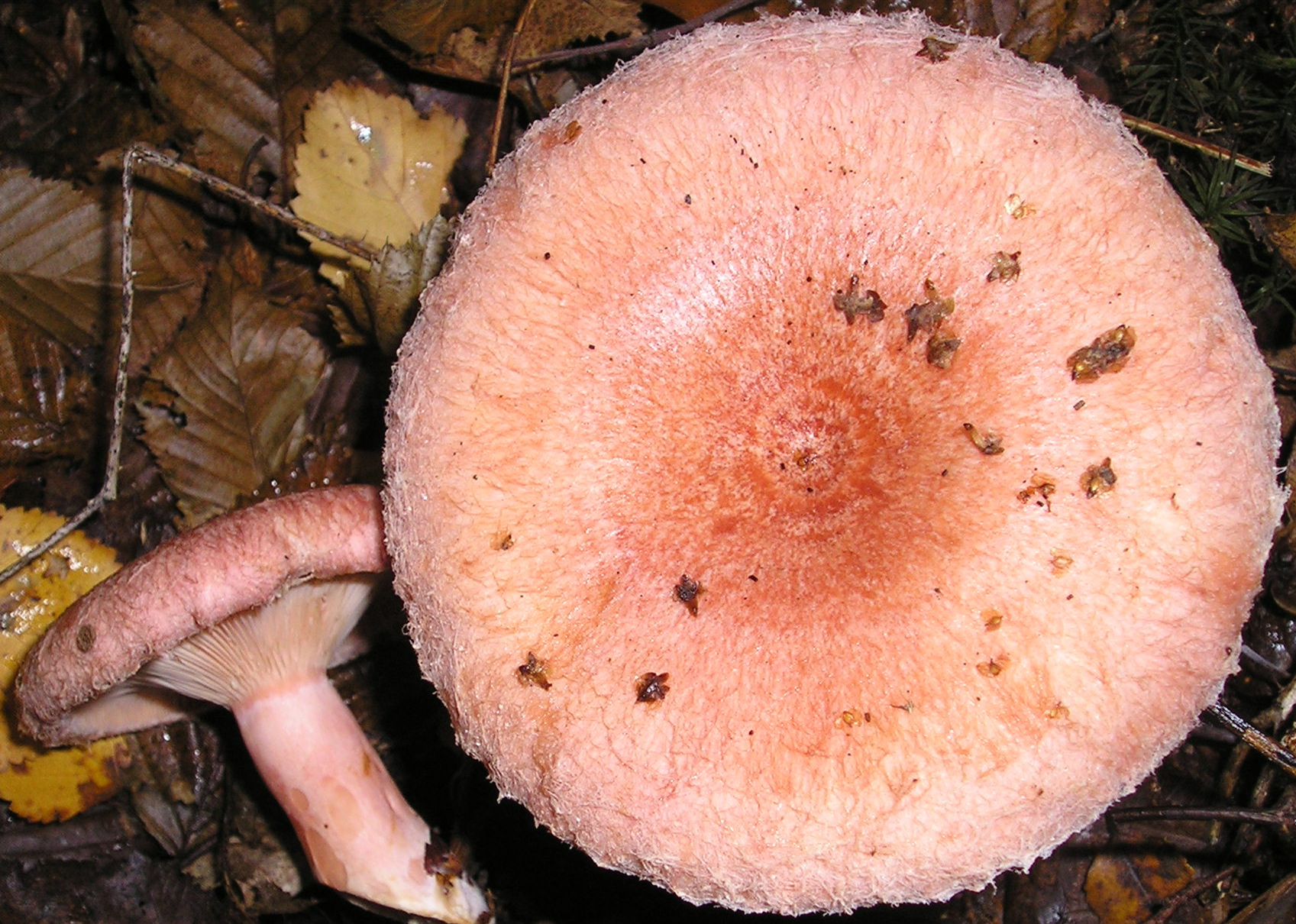
Zonation is less prominent in mature mushrooms.

The gills are subdecurrent (running only a small way down the length of the stem), close to crowded together, narrow, and sometimes forked near the stem. Their color is whitish, becoming pink-tinged, turning pale tan with age. The adult stem is 1.5–8 cm (1/2–3 in) long, 0.6–2 cm (1/4–3/4 in) thick, fragile, more or less equal in width throughout, and cylindrical or narrowed at the base. Its surface is dry, and either smooth to pruinose (covered with a very fine whitish powder on the surface). The color ranges from pale light pink to yellowish-tinged or slightly pinkish-orange to orange-white, sometimes spotted. The interior of the stem is firm, beige white, and filled with a soft pith, but it eventually becomes hollow. Occasionally, white mycelium is visible at the base of the stem where it meets the ground.

The fruit body formation of L. torminosus is pileostipitocarpic. In this type of development, the hymenium forms early on the underside of the cap and upper stem of the mushroom primordium. As the cap enlarges, the margin, made of flaring filamentous hyphae that grow outward and downward, tends to curve inward, eventually forming a flap of tissue roughly parallel to the stem surface. As further development takes place, these hyphae make contact with and adhere to the hymenial surface of the stem, covering basidia and macrocystidia (very long cystidia) already present. The junction between the two tissues produces a cavity that provides some temporary protection to the basidia, although they are already fertile when the cap margin starts to grow.

=== Microscopic characteristics ===
The spore print of L. torminosus is cream to pale yellow, and the spores 8–10.2 by 5.8–6.6 μm, roughly spherical to broadly elliptical in side view, and hyaline (translucent). Only the ornamentation on their surface is amyloid; it is partially reticulate (network-like) with interrupted ridges roughly 0.5–0.7 μm high, and a few isolated warts. Spores have a conspicuous apiculus, demarcating where it was once attached to the basidia via the sterigma. The basidia are four-spored, hyaline and club-shaped to cylindrical, measuring 30–47.7 by 7.3–8.2 μm.

Pleurocystidia are present only in the form of macrocystidia embedded and originating in the hymenium and just below it, they reach 40.3–80.0 by 5.1–9.5 μm. Macrocystidia are abundant in the hymenium. Characterized by their spindle-shaped to ventricose (swollen on one side) form that gradually tapers in width, they have granular hyaline contents. Gill edge cystidia (cheilocystidia) are smaller: 30–52 by 4.5–8.0 μm. The cap cuticle is made of gelatinized, interwoven hyphae arranged more or less parallel to the cap surface (a form known as ixocutis); the thin-walled, threadlike hyphae of this layer are 2.5–7.3 μm wide.

=== Variety nordmanensis ===
Lactarius nordmanensis was described by Alexander Smith in 1960 to account for a North American species closely resembling L. torminosus in appearance, but with a slightly larger range of spore sizes (9–11 by 6.5–8 μm). In contrast to the unchanging latex of L. torminosus, L. nordmanensis has whitish latex that slowly changes to pale yellow upon exposure to air; the latex also stains mushroom tissues and paper yellow. Hesler and Smith reduced L. nordmanensis to the status of a variety under L. torminosus in 1979. Lactarius torminosus var. nordmanensis has been recorded from California, Idaho, Michigan, and Wisconsin in the United States, Quebec in Canada, and Switzerland. The variety resembles Lactarius pubescens var. betulae, but differs in its longer pleurocystidia, larger spores with slightly different spore ornamentation, and strongly burning acrid taste. The holotype specimen of L. torminosus var. nordmanensis was collected by Smith in 1956 near Nordman, Idaho.

=== Similar species ===
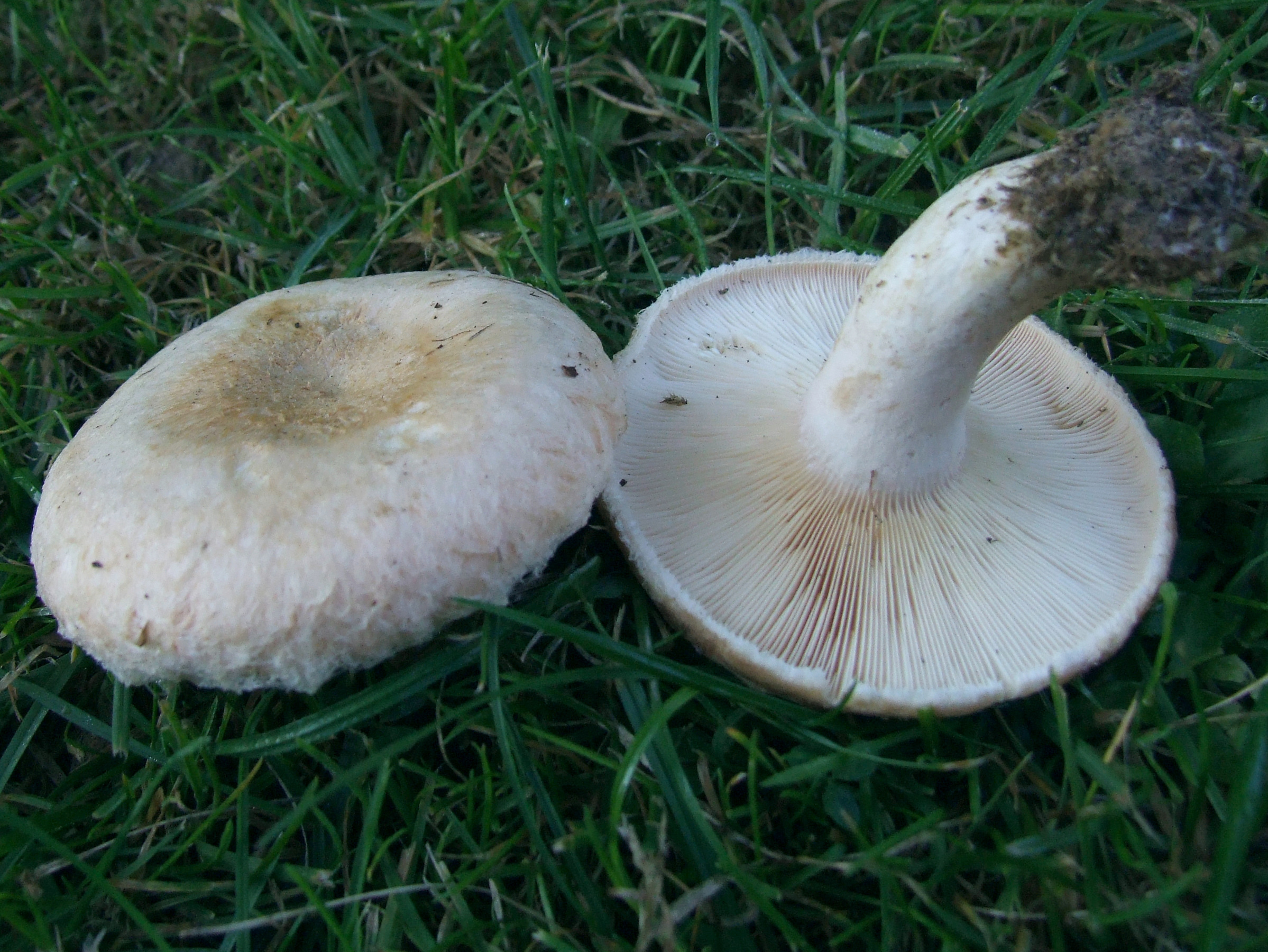
Lactarius pubescens

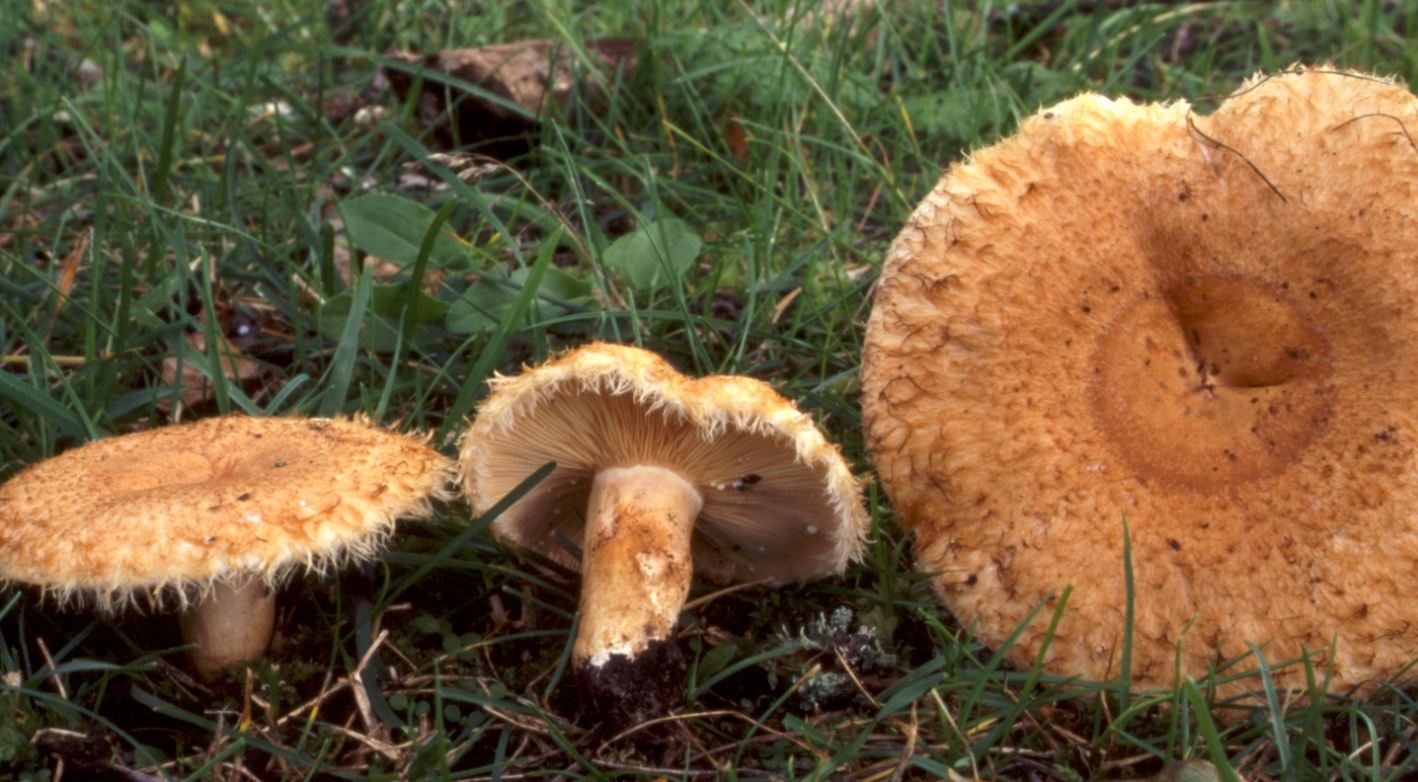
Lactarius mairei

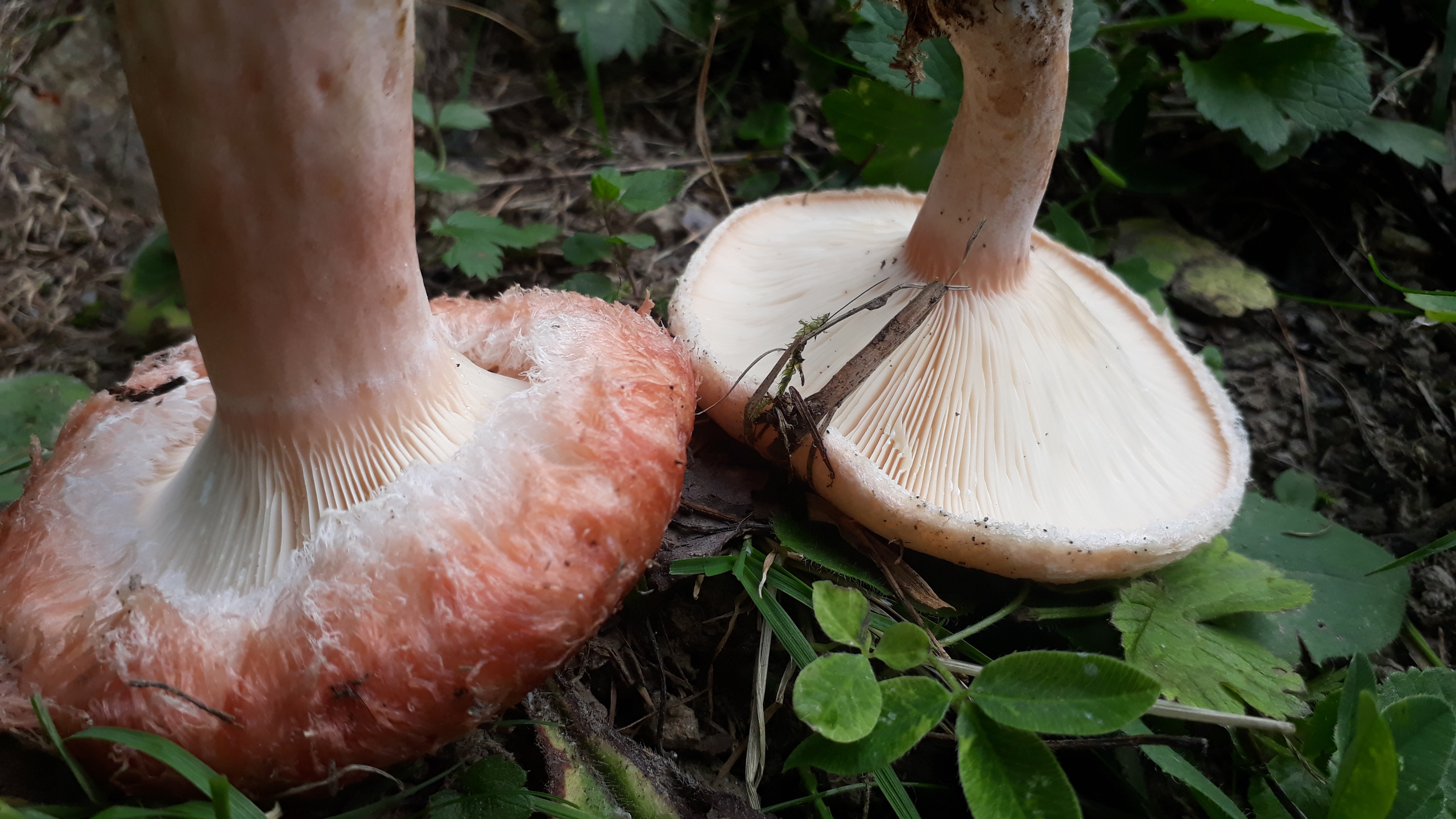
Lactarius torminosus (left) with L. pubescens (right)

The woolly cap margin, pinkish tones in the cap, acrid latex, and association with birch are reliable field characteristics to help identify L. torminosus. However, there are several hairy Lactarius species with which it is often confused, and sometimes examination of microscopic characteristics is necessary to distinguish between them. The closely related L. torminosulus is a dwarf version of L. torminosus, an arctic species associated with the birches Betula nana or B. glandulosa. Immature fruit bodies of L. scrobiculatus resemble L. torminosus, but they have a white latex that soon turns yellow upon exposure to air, and their stems have shiny depressed spots. The caps of the poorly known species L. cilicioides are not zonate, and its spores are smaller. L. pubescens is physically quite similar, but can be distinguished by its paler color and smaller spores (6.0–7.5 by 5.0–6.5 μm). L. controversus has a cap margin that is not as hairy, whitish to cream-colored gills, and larger spores measuring 7.5–10 by 6–7.5 μm. L. mairei has a coloration similar to L. torminosus, but is rarer and typically found associated with oak trees on calcareous soil. Known only from North Carolina and western Canada, L. subtorminosus was named for its similarity to L. torminosus. It can be distinguished by its mild-tasting latex and smaller, roughly spherical spores measuring 5.5–7 by 5.5–6.5 μm. In North America, L. psammicola grows with eastern hardwoods and L. subvillosus appears in tanoak-madrone woodland.

== Distribution and habitat ==
Lactarius torminosus is found in northern temperate and boreal climates, penetrating sometimes into subarctic regions. It has been recorded from North Africa, northern Asia, Europe, and is common in North America, where it sometimes grows with aspen (Populus species). The North American distribution extends north into the Yukon and Alaska and south to Mexico.

== Ecology ==
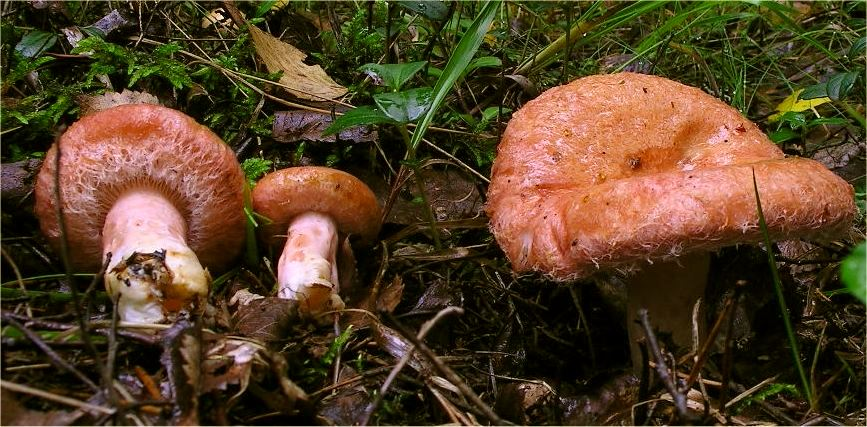
In Västerbotten, Sweden

Lactarius torminosus is a mycorrhizal species, and as such plays an important role in facilitating nutrient and water uptake by trees. It grows in association with birch (Betula) and hemlock (Tsuga) in mixed forests. It is also known to grow in urban settings when birch trees are nearby. A field study in Scotland concluded that the species is more likely to be present in older than in younger birch woodlands. Fruit bodies grow on the ground, scattered or grouped together. They are a component of the diet of the red squirrel, and serve as breeding sites for some fungus-feeding flies in the Drosophilidae and Mycetophilidae families. Lactarius torminosus mushrooms may be parasitized by the mold Hypomyces lithuanicus, which produces a cream-ochre to cinnamon-colored granular or velvety growth of mycelium on the surfaces of the gills and causes them to be deformed.

== Toxicity ==
"Its taste is biting, worse than Cayenne pepper ... Unless he possessed a stomach built for the purpose, the man who touched such food as this would have a singularly bad time before him."

— Jean-Henri Fabre

The intensely peppery taste of the raw mushroom can blister the tongue if sampled in excess. Some authors have reported the species as outright poisonous, or causing "mild to fatal gastroenteritis". In a 1930 publication, Hans Steidle reported that although the mushroom was not toxic to "unicellular and cold-blooded organisms" when ingested, the liquid extract and the pressed juice of the fruit bodies, when injected under the skin of a frog, resulted in disturbed breathing, paralysis, and eventually death. Symptoms that are typically experienced after consuming raw mushrooms include nausea, vomiting, and severe diarrhea starting about one hour after ingestion. This combination can lead to dehydration, muscle spasms, and circulatory collapse. The gastroenteritis will usually resolve without treatment in a couple of days.

== Uses ==
Despite the reports of toxicity, L. torminosus mushrooms are prepared in Finland, Russia, and other northern and eastern European countries by parboiling, soaking in brine for several days, or pickling, after which they are valued for their peppery taste. Mushrooms are harvested for commercial sale in Finland. The nutrient composition of Finnish specimens has been analyzed and found to contain the following components (as a percentage of dry weight): protein, 17.20%; phosphorus, 0.46%; calcium, 0.12%; magnesium, 0.09%; potassium, 2.97%; sodium 0.01%.

== Chemistry ==
Structure of the sesquiterpene velleral

The compound thought to be responsible for the toxicity of raw L. torminosus is the pungent-tasting velleral present at a concentration of 0.16 mg/g mushroom. Velleral is a breakdown product of stearyl-velutinal. Broken lactifers—specialized hyphal cells that produce the mushroom's latex—leak the precursor chemicals whose breakdown products act as the defensive agents toxic to humans, effectively deterring certain vertebrates that might consume the mushroom. The lactarane-type lactone 15-hydroxyblennin A is one of several sesquiterpenes produced by the species. Other lactaranes are found in various Lactarius species, such as blennin A in L. deliciosus and L. blennius, and lactarorufin N in Lactarius rufus. Fungal sesquiterpenes are commonly produced as toxins to defend against predation, and as a result some have chemical properties that may have applications in medicinal chemistry.

Fruit bodies of L. torminosus contain a number of sterols, of which ergosterol (a component of fungal cell walls) is the most predominant at 60.5% of all sterols, followed by its derivatives and ergosta-5/7-dien-3-ol (17.0%), ergost-7-en-3-ol (13.7%) and ergosta-7-22-dien-3-ol (8.3%). Researchers have identified 28 volatile compounds that contribute to the odor of the mushroom. Many of these are alcohols and carbonyl compounds with eight carbon atoms; the predominant volatile compound (about 90%) is 1-octen-3-one, an odorant common in mushrooms.

== See also ==
- List of deadly fungi
- List of Lactarius species

== Cited texts ==
- Bessette AR, Bessette AE, Harris DB (2009). Milk Mushrooms of North America: A Field Guide to the Genus Lactarius. Syracuse, New York: Syracuse University Press. ISBN 978-0-8156-3229-0.
- Hesler LR, Smith AH (1979). North American Species of Lactarius. Ann Arbor, Michigan: The University of Michigan Press. ISBN 978-0-472-08440-1.
