= Parolactarius =

Parolactarius Temporal range: mid Cretaceous ~98.79 Ma

Scientific classification
- Kingdom: Fungi
- Division: Basidiomycota
- Class: Agaricomycetes
- Order: Russulales
- Genus: †Parolactarius; Lin et al., 2026
- Species: †P. pilosus

Binomial name
- †Parolactarius pilosus Lin et al., 2026

Extinct genus of Russulales fungi

Parolactarius is an extinct fungus from the middle Cretaceous of Myanmar, with probable affinities to the Russulaceae family. It is a monotypic genus, containing only Parolactarius pilosus.

== Discovery and naming ==
The holotype material for Parolactarius was found within Kachin amber, which was collected from the Hukawng Valley, Northern Myanmar, in rocks dated to 98.79±0.62 ma. It was formally described and named in 2026.

The generic name Parolactarius derives from the Greek word "para", to mean the same; and the genus name of the extant Lactarius, in reference to the similarities between the two. The specific name pilosus directly derives from the Latin word of the same spelling, "pilosus", to mean hairy, in reference to the hairy surface of the fungus.

== Description ==
Parolactarius pilosus is a small capped fungus, with a basidiocarp getting up to 2.5 mm (0.1 in) in height, and 2.7 mm (0.1 in) at its widest. The basidiocarp consists of a stalk, which on top sits a centrally attached cap. The entire preserved surface of the fungus is covered in small, translucent hyphal hair-like structures, which can range between 0.1–0.4 mm (0.0–0.0 in) in length, and 5–15 μm (0.00020–0.00059 in) in width. The stalk is sub-cylindrical in appearance, and slightly thins out towards the preserved base. The attached cap is sub-orbicular in shape, with notably rounded margins, although it has a flattened top.

It is noted that there are no preserved hymenophore, which is a part of a fruiting body found in fungi, as such suggesting that the specimen was in an immature stage when encased.

== Affinities ==
When compared with the immature stages of extant Agaricomycetes, the researchers noted Parolactarius bore many similarities with the extant genus Lactarius, primarily the species L. torminosus and L. pubescens, which reside in the family Russulaceae. Although it is noted that it remains distinct from these, as Lactarius is not known to have hairs on the stalk, and are larger in size than Parolactarius.

From this, the researchers were able to infer Parolactarius as the earliest known Russulaceae-like fungus, possibly occupying a phylogenetic point between the division of the basidiomycete and extant family of the Russulaceae.

== Palaeoecology ==
The palaeoenvironment of Parolactarius was that of a tropical coastal swamp, containing a rich variety of other flora, from Metasequoia to Agathis trees, and is comparable to the modern day Waipoua Forest in New Zealand. This environment is noted to be perfect for many fungi, and is in fact expected of said environment.

Parolactarius most likely lived amongst a layer of leaf litter on the forest floor of this coastal swamp, within what would have been moist soils, akin to the extant Lactarius.The dense hair coverage of Parolactarius may have also helped it retain the moisture from the soils it resided in, as well as help with spore dispersal.
