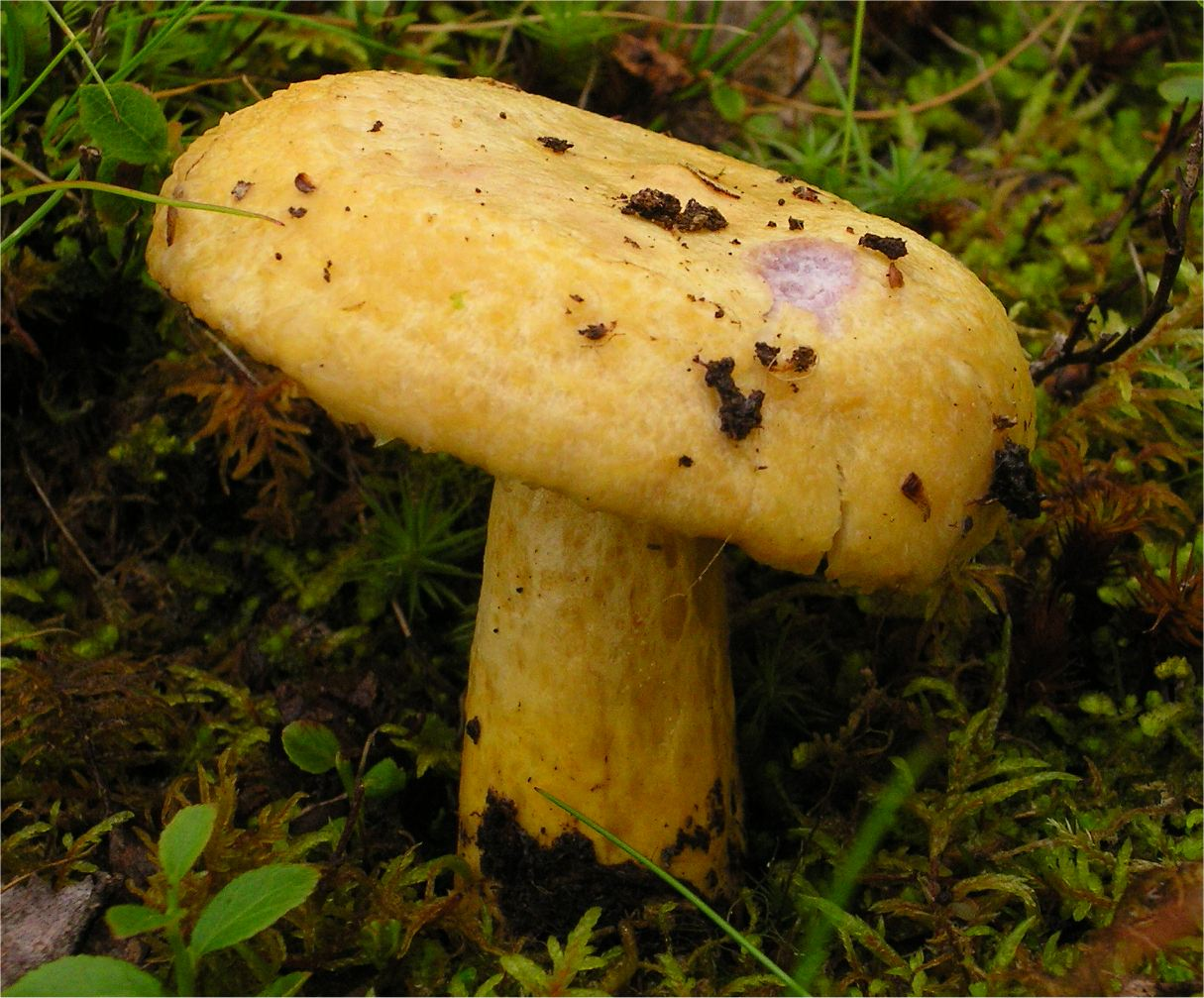
- in Lapland, Sweden

Scientific classification
- Domain: Eukaryota
- Kingdom: Fungi
- Division: Basidiomycota
- Class: Agaricomycetes
- Order: Russulales
- Family: Russulaceae
- Genus: Lactarius
- Species: L. repraesentaneus

Binomial name
- Lactarius repraesentaneus Britzelm. (1885)

Synonyms
- L. scrobiculatus var. repraesentaneus (Britzelm.) Killerm. (1933)

= Lactarius repraesentaneus =

Species of fungus

Lactarius repraesentaneus Mycological characteristics
- Gills on hymenium
- Cap is depressed
- Hymenium is decurrent
- Stipe is bare
- Spore print is yellow
- Ecology is mycorrhizal
- Edibility is poisonous

Lactarius repraesentaneus, commonly known as the purple-staining bearded milkcap, the northern bearded milkcap, or the northern milkcap, is a species of fungus in the family Russulaceae.

Distinguishing features of its fruit body include the large orange-yellow cap up to 18 cm (7.1 in) wide, cream to pale yellow gills, and a yellow coarsely-pitted stem that is up to 12 cm (4.7 in) long and 3 cm (1.2 in) thick. Cut fruit bodies ooze a white latex that will stain mushroom tissue lilac to purple.

The species has a northerly distribution, being found in temperate regions of North America and Europe. It is associated with spruce trees. The mushroom is poisonous, its consumption causing stomach aches. It has antibiotic activity against Staphylococcus aureus and contains chemicals that can modify the growth of plants.

== Taxonomy ==
Lactarius repraesentaneus was first described by German mycologist Max Britzelmayr in 1885, based on material collected from Bavaria. The variety Lactarius scrobiculatus var. repraesentaneus, proposed by Killermann in 1933, is considered a synonym. Rolf Singer in 1942 defined the subspecies L. repraesentaneus ssp. speciosus to include fruit bodies with matted fibers ("felt") arranged in concentric rings on the cap (zonate), in comparison with the nominate subspecies, where in young specimens the felt was evenly distributed on the cap surface, only becoming zonate at the cap margins in maturity.

According to the classification proposed by Lexemuel Ray Hesler and Alexander H. Smith in their 1979 monograph of North American Lactarius species, L. repraesentaneus belongs in the stirps Speciosus of the section Aspideini, of the subgenus Piperites of genus Lactarius. Other species in stirps Speciosus include L. dispersus, L. subtorminosus, and L. speciosus, all of which have a hairy cap edge. Singer's 1986 classification of the Agaricales does not divide subsection Aspideini into stirpes, instead grouping Lactarius repraesentaneus with L. aspideus, L. uvidus, L. luridis, L. psammicola, and L. speciosus.

The mushroom is commonly known as the "northern bearded milkcap", the "northern milkcap", or the "purple-staining milkcap". The specific epithet repraesentaneus is Latin for "well-represented".

== Description ==
The cap of L. repraesentaneus is 6–18 cm (2.4–7.1 in) wide, convex to broadly funnel-shaped. The margin (the edge of the cap) is conspicuously bearded on young specimens. The cap surface is faintly zoned to azonate, with a thin layer of matted fibers, often becoming scurfy with age. It is dry to somewhat sticky, light yellow to orange-yellow, sometimes with rusty tints when older. The attachment of the gills to the stem is slightly decurrent—running slightly down the length of the stem. The gills are moderately broad, close to crowded, sometimes forked near the stem. Normally a cream to pale ochraceous color, they will stain dull lilac to purple when bruised.

The stem is 5–12 cm (2.0–4.7 in) long, 1–3 cm (0.4–1.2 in) thick, nearly equal in width throughout or enlarged downward, hollow at maturity, sticky to dry, scrobiculate (coarsely pitted), pale yellow to orange-yellow, and stains dull lilac to purple. The flesh is firm, brittle, white, and will stain dull lilac to purple when cut. The odor is sometimes faintly fragrant or not distinctive, but when the mushroom is dry it smells intensely of soap. Its taste is mild to slightly acrid or somewhat bitter, and the flavor has been compared to sweet flag (Acorus calamus). The abundant amount of latex produced by the mushroom is white to cream, unchanging, staining all tissues dull lilac to purple. It tastes mild to slightly acrid or somewhat bitter. The spore print is yellowish.

A new form, Lactarius repraesentaneus f. immutabilis, was described from Le Sappey, in the Haute-Savoie department of southeastern France in 2011. It differs in the staining reaction of its injured flesh.

The spores are 8–12 by 6.5–9 μm, broadly ellipsoid to ellipsoid, ornamented with warts and ridges that do not form a reticulum, prominences up to 0.8 μm high, hyaline, and amyloid. The cap cuticle is an ixocutis—with the hyphae embedded in a slimy or gelatinized layer.

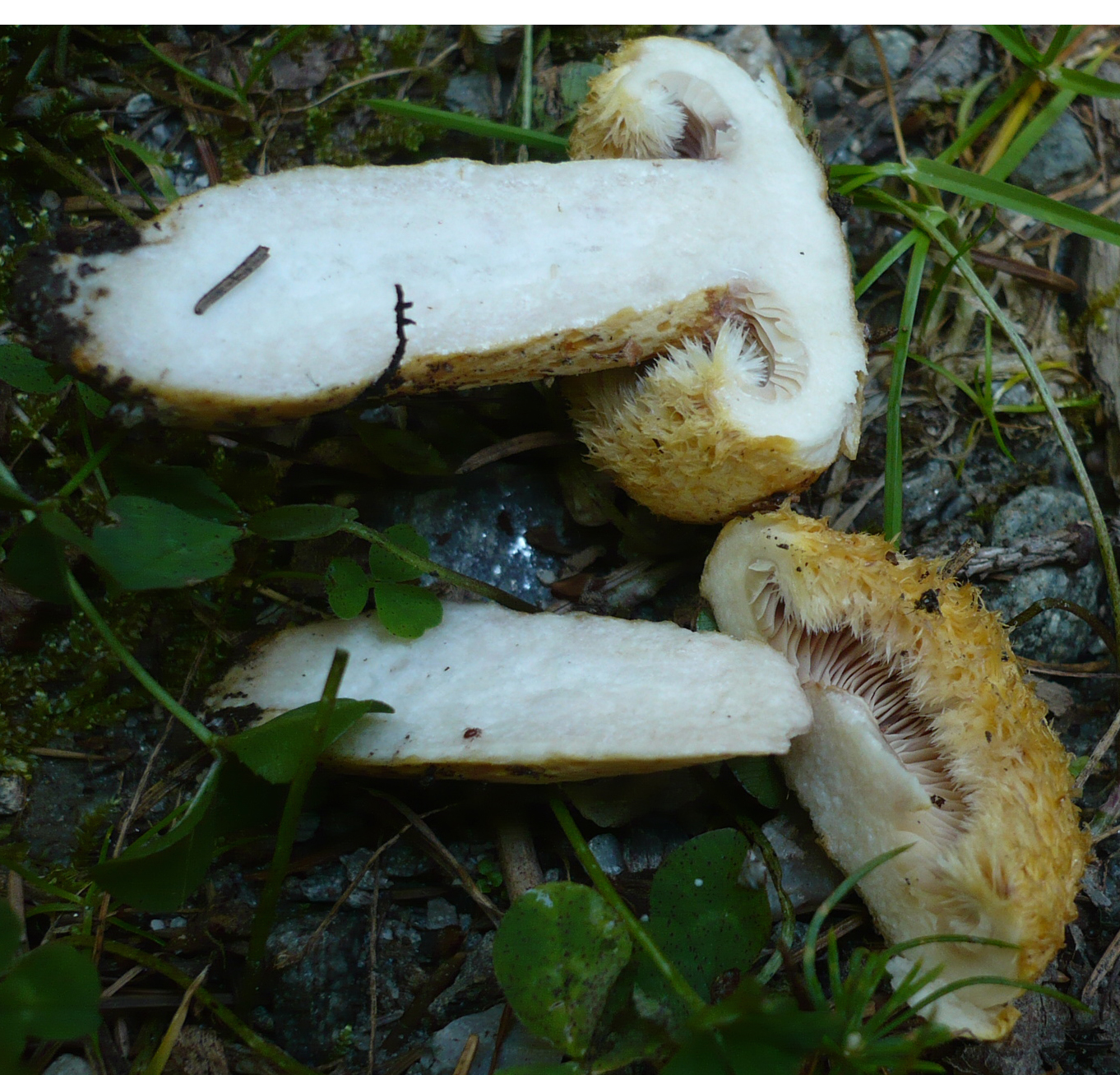
Young specimens are bearded on the cap margin.

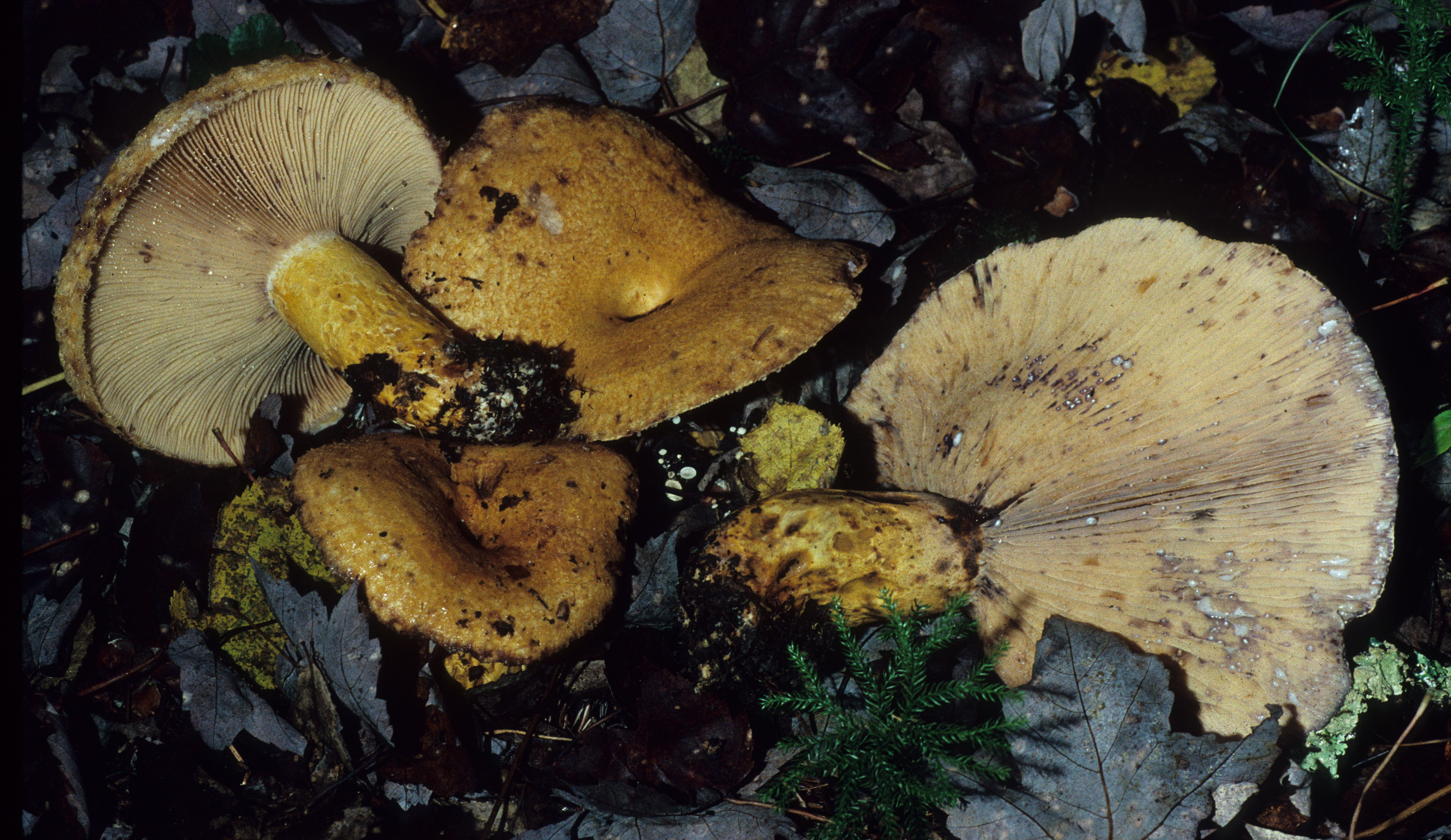
The gills, normally cream to dull yellow, stain purple when bruised.

=== Similar species ===
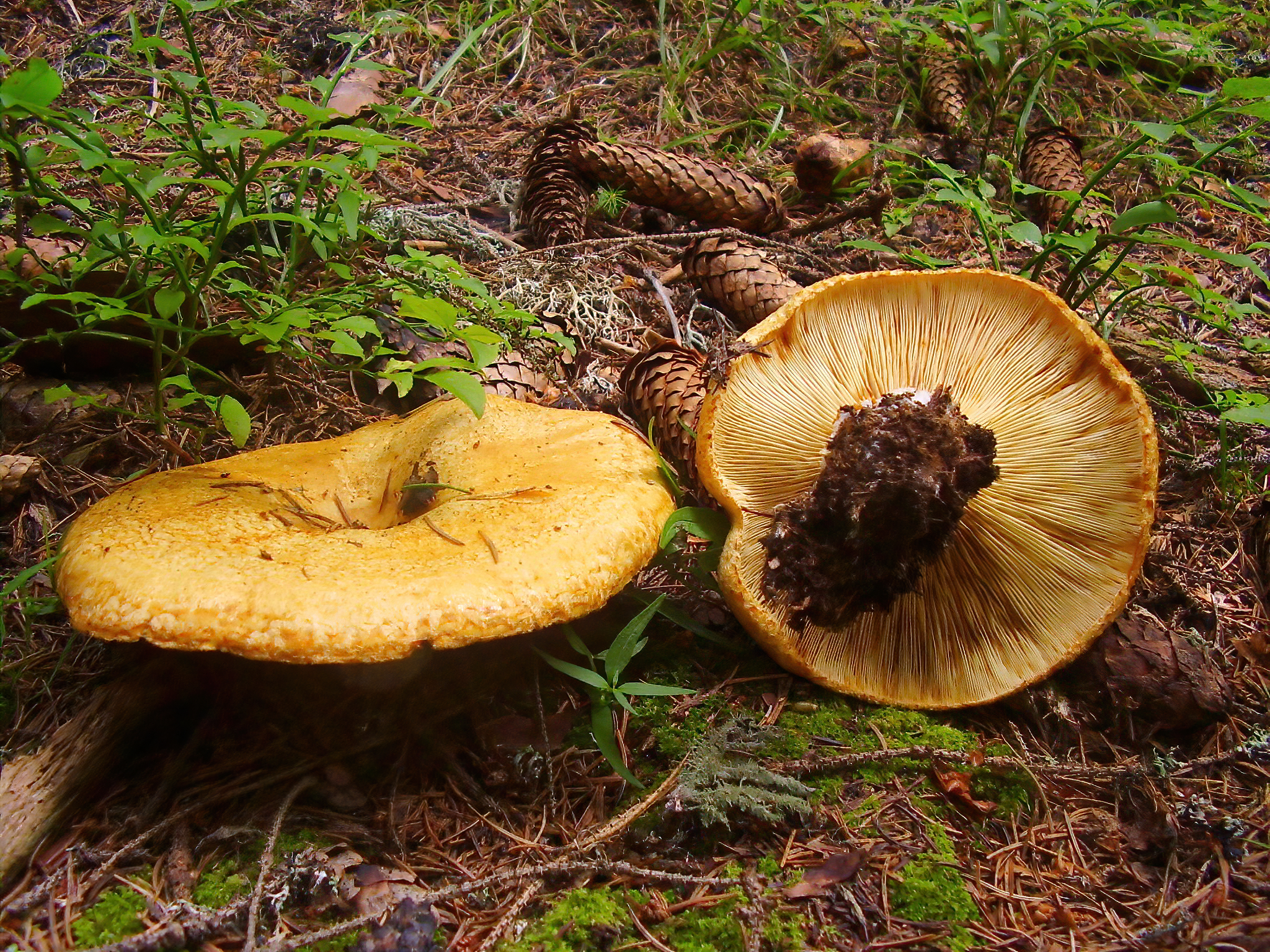
Lactarius scrobiculatus

Lactarius repraesentaneus is similar in appearance to Lactarius scrobiculatus, which has latex that turns yellow when exposed to air, a different smell, a stinging flesh and a different reaction of the milk to alkali: in L. scrobiculatus the milk turns reddish-orange while that of L. representaneus does not change color. Lactarius uvidus also has a violet reaction but it has a different color and is not hairy at the margin of the cap. L. flavidus has a yellowish cap but does not have a hairy margin.

== Habitat and distribution ==
Like other Lactarius species, L. repraesentaneus is thought to form mycorrhizal relationships with trees. This is a mutually beneficial relationship where the hyphae of the fungus grow around the roots of trees, forming a sheath of tissue. This enables the fungus to receive moisture, protection and nutritive byproducts of the tree, and affords the tree greater access to soil nutrients. The fruit bodies of L. repraesentaneus are found scattered or in groups on the ground under spruce from August to September. The fungus is distributed in higher elevations in the northern USA and southern Canada where spruce is present. It has also been reported from Alaska, California, and the Rocky Mountains. The frequency of its appearance is described as occasional to fairly common. In Europe, where it is fairly rare, it is found mainly underneath sallows (Salix capraea) in forests at the foot of mountains on non-calcareous soil. It has been collected in Czechoslovakia, Sweden, Switzerland, the French Alps and England; overall, it is widely distributed throughout the temperate zone of the northern hemisphere. The fungus has also been collected under birch (B. pubescens, B. nana, and B. glandulosa) in Greenland.

== Uses ==
The fruit bodies are considered poisonous and consumption will cause stomach aches, but the nature of the toxic agents has not been identified.

== Bioactive compounds ==
Lactarius repraesentaneus was reported to have antibiotic activity against Staphylococcus aureus in 1947. The substance responsible for the antibacterial activity, determined to be heat-sensitive, was not identified. A number of chemicals have been isolated and identified from L. repraesentaneus that can regulate the growth of plants. The chemicals, in a class called sesquiterpenoids are named repraesentin A, and two related sesquiterpenes, namely repraesentins B and C. These compounds were shown to promote the radicle elongation of lettuce seedlings by 136%, 118% and 184% at 67 ppm, respectively. Other compounds reported in 2006 are repraesentins D, E, and F. Repraesentin E showed the strongest growth promotion activity, 164% at 3.6 μm, of the three compounds toward the radicle elongation of lettuce seedlings.

== See also ==
- List of Lactarius species

== Cited text ==
- Hesler LR, Smith AH (1979). North American Species of Lactarius. Michigan: The University of Michigan Press. ISBN 0-472-08440-2.
