= Velleral =

Names
- Preferred IUPAC name (3aR,8R,8aR)-2,2,8-Trimethyl-1,2,3,3a,8,8a-hexahydroazulene-5,6-dicarbaldehyde

Identifiers
CAS Number	50656-61-6
3D model (JSmol)	Interactive image
ChEMBL	ChEMBL479316
ChemSpider	20036851
PubChem CID	14412869
UNII	MS9HB5PQ54
CompTox Dashboard (EPA)	DTXSID301030304
- InChI: InChI=1S/C15H20O2/c1-10-4-12(8-16)13(9-17)5-11-6-15(2,3)7-14(10)11/h4-5,8-11,14H,6-7H2,1-3H3/t10-,11+,14+/m0/s1 Key: GUAUUIHVMRMGCT-MISXGVKJSA-N; InChI=1/C15H20O2/c1-10-4-12(8-16)13(9-17)5-11-6-15(2,3)7-14(10)11/h4-5,8-11,14H,6-7H2,1-3H3/t10-,11+,14+/m0/s1 Key: GUAUUIHVMRMGCT-MISXGVKJBT
- SMILES: O=C/C1=C/[C@@H]2CC(C)(C)C[C@@H]2[C@@H](C)/C=C1/C=O

Properties
Chemical formula	C_{15}H_{20}O_{2}
Molar mass	232.323 g·mol^{−1}
Density	1.093 g/cm^{3}

Hazards
Flash point	127.95 °C (262.31 °F; 401.10 K)
- Except where otherwise noted, data are given for materials in their standard state (at 25 °C [77 °F], 100 kPa). Infobox references

Velleral (2,2,8-trimethyl-3,3a,8,8a-tetrahydro-1H-azulene-5,6-dicarbaldehyde) is a sesquiterpene dialdehyde found in certain mushrooms, like Lactarius torminosus and Lactarius vellereus, after which it was named. The compound is thought to be part of a chemical defense system that protects the mushrooms against predation. First isolated in 1969, and characterized structurally in 1973, velleral has antimicrobial activity. Several syntheses have been devised.
