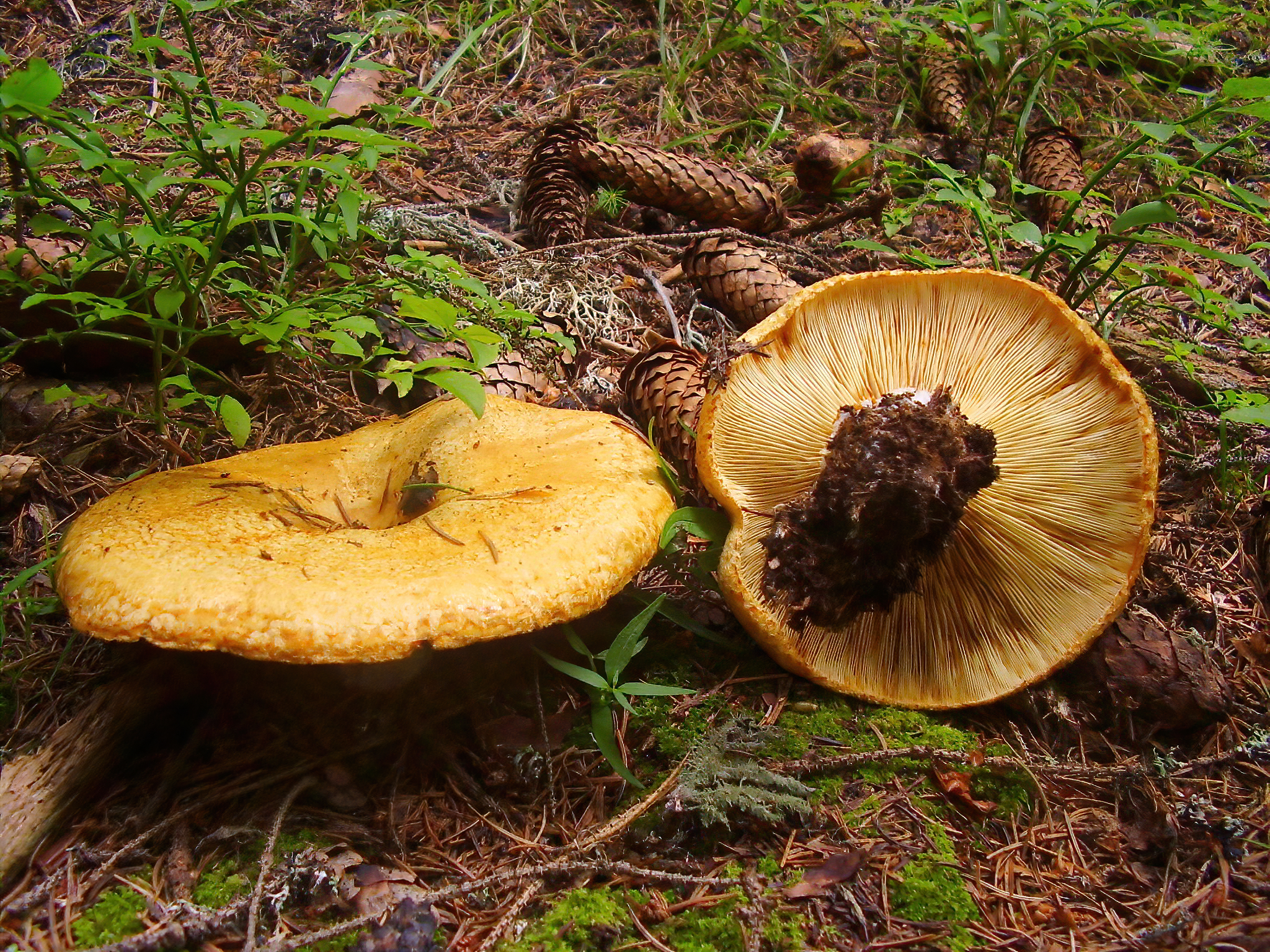

Scientific classification
- Kingdom: Fungi
- Division: Basidiomycota
- Class: Agaricomycetes
- Order: Russulales
- Family: Russulaceae
- Genus: Lactarius
- Species: L. scrobiculatus

Binomial name
- Lactarius scrobiculatus (Scop.) Fr. (1838)

Synonyms
- Agaricus scrobiculatus Scop. (1772); Agaricus intermedius Fr. (1815); Galorrheus scrobiculatus (Scop.) P.Kumm. (1871); Lactifluus scrobiculatus (Scop.) Kuntze (1891)

= Lactarius scrobiculatus =

Species of fungus

Lactarius scrobiculatus
- Mycological characteristics
- Gills on hymenium
- Cap is depressed
- Hymenium is decurrent
- Stipe is bare
- Spore print is cream
- Ecology is mycorrhizal
- Edibility is inedible

Lactarius scrobiculatus, commonly known as the scrobiculate milk cap or potholed milk cap, is a basidiomycete fungus, belonging to the genus Lactarius, the members of which are called "milk caps".

The distinctive fruiting bodies of this large fungus are locally common in forests throughout Europe and North America. It is regarded as inedible by some authors, but it is nevertheless eaten in parts of Europe.

== Taxonomy ==
The species is placed in subgenus Piperites, section Zonarii, subsection Scrobiculati.

== Description ==
Lactarius scrobiculatus produces large agaricoid fruiting bodies which arise from soil. The cap has an eye-catching orange to yellow coloration and is covered with small scales arranged in indistinctive concentric rings. The surface is wet, glossy and slimy especially in wet weather. The cap may be wide, about 15 centimetres (6 in) wide when mature, with a depressed centre and slightly enrolled margin. The gills are crowded and coloured cream to yellow, with darker patches being present sometimes. When cut, the gills bleed copious amounts of a white to cream milk (latex), which soon darkens to yellow. The stem, in relation to the cap, is quite short and stubby, in addition to being hollow. The surface is cap-coloured but the presence of small pits, filled with fluid, is a key identifying feature. The spores are coloured creamy with an elliptical-globular shape.

When a small piece of flesh is chewed, it tastes bitter to acrid. One researcher reports developing a numbness in the mouth after nibbling on a piece. It does not have a discernible smell.

There are several recognised varieties, including var. canadensis. var. montanus and var. pubescens.

=== Similar species ===
Similar species include Lactarius alnicola, L. controversus, L. plumbeus, L. repraesentaneus, and L. torminosus.

== Distribution and habitat ==
Lactarius scrobiculatus is known to occur throughout Europe, and to a lesser extent North America where its occurrence is rare. It occurs primarily in coniferous and birch forests. It forms mycorrhizal relationships and appears to prefer damp, shady and boggy areas. The fruiting bodies appear in troops, sometimes forming fairy rings and only rarely occur singly. The fruiting season is summer to autumn.

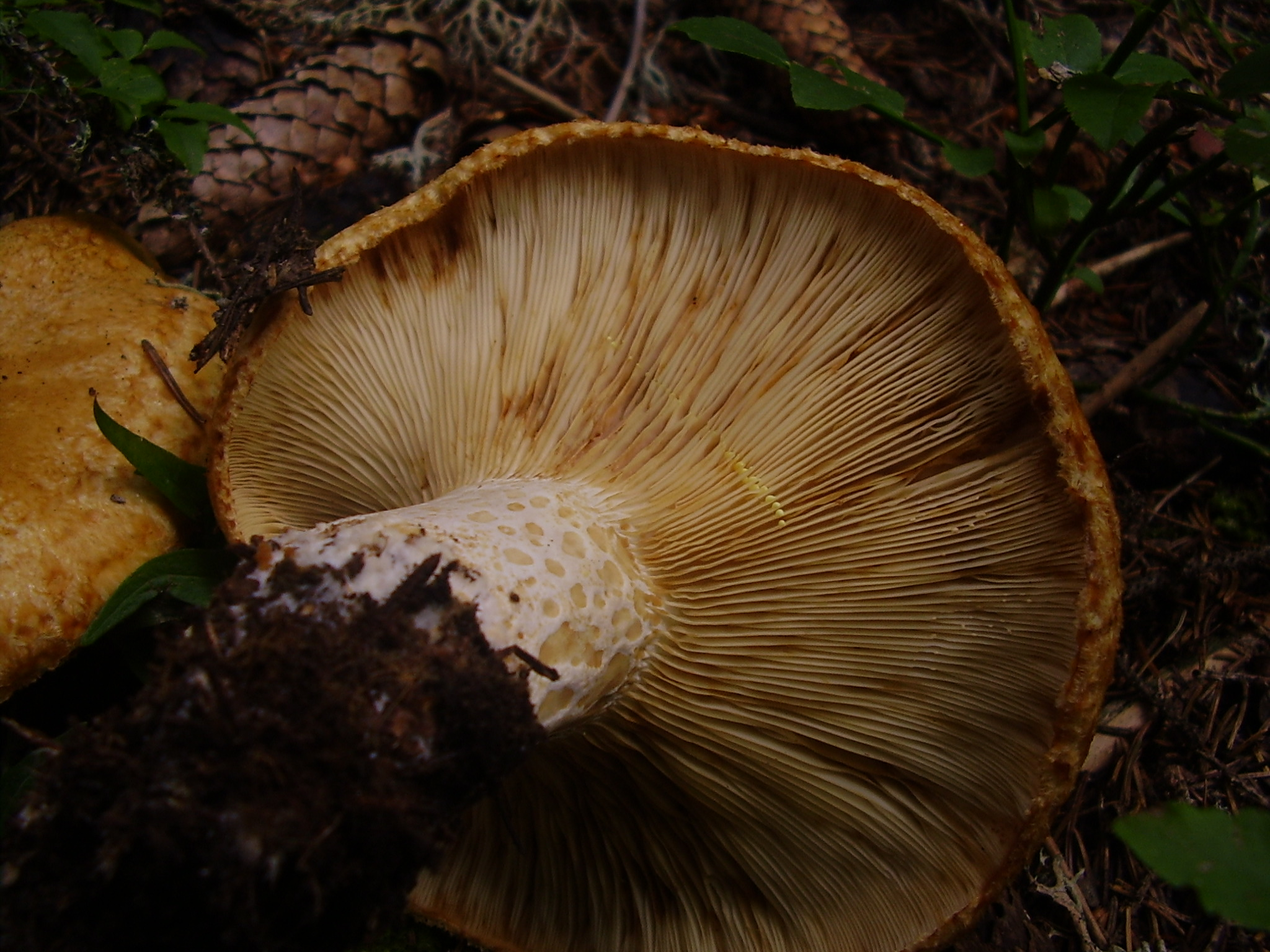
Closeup of gills and stem, showing latex

== Edibility ==
Most authors consider the species inedible. It is collected and eaten in parts of eastern Europe and Russia after salting, pickling and thorough cooking. Consuming it causes gastrointestinal upset. Careful preparation seeks to neutralise the acrid taste. This usually involves a process of boiling, during which the water is discarded. Further cooking and pickling may not eliminate the possibility of distressing symptoms.

== See also ==
- List of Lactarius species
