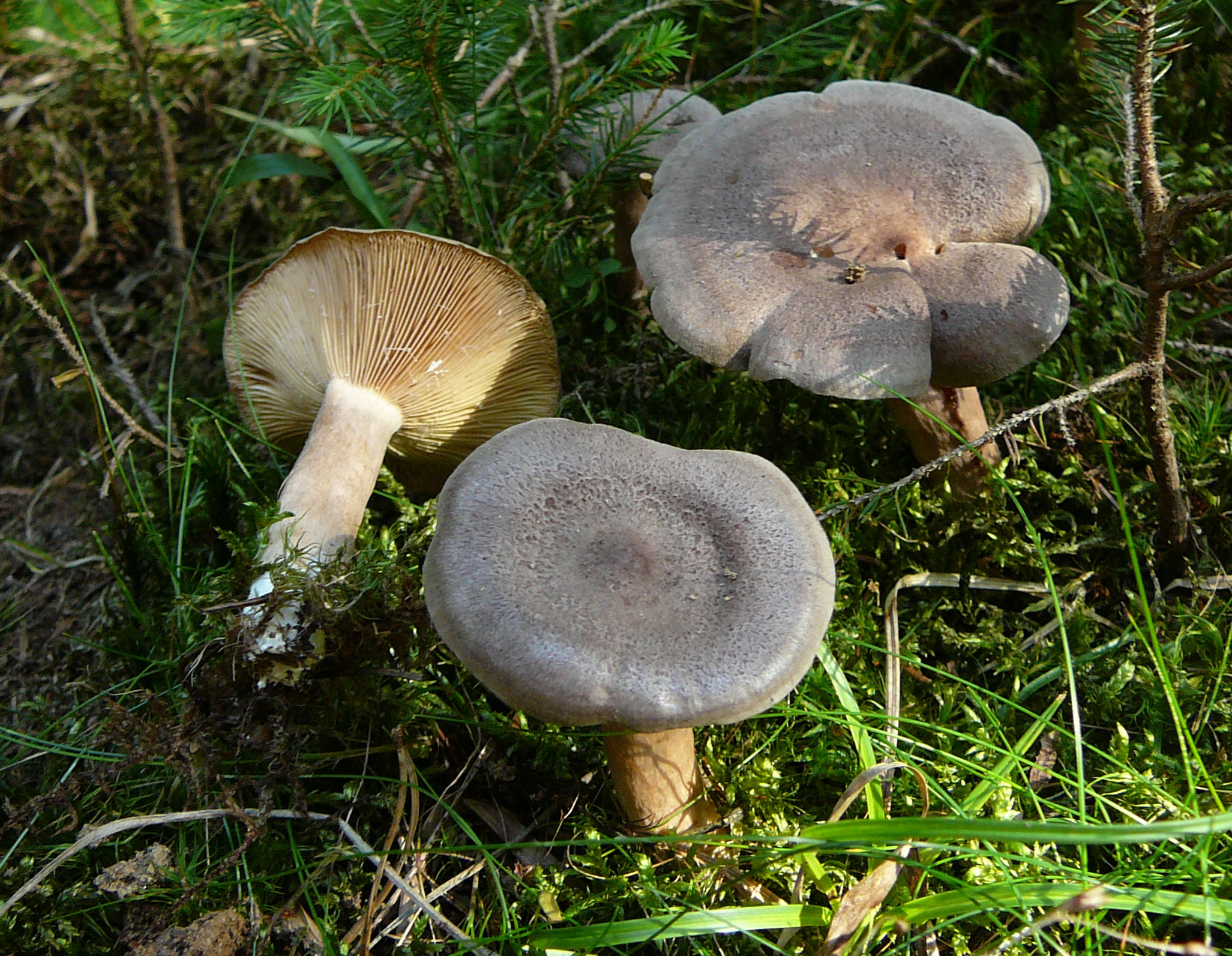

Scientific classification
- Kingdom: Fungi
- Division: Basidiomycota
- Class: Agaricomycetes
- Order: Russulales
- Family: Russulaceae
- Genus: Lactarius
- Species: L. mammosus

Binomial name
- Lactarius mammosus Fr., 1838

= Lactarius mammosus =

Species of fungus

Lactarius mammosus is a species of fungus belonging to the family Russulaceae. The English vernacular name is Pap Milkcap

It is native to Europe and Northern America.
