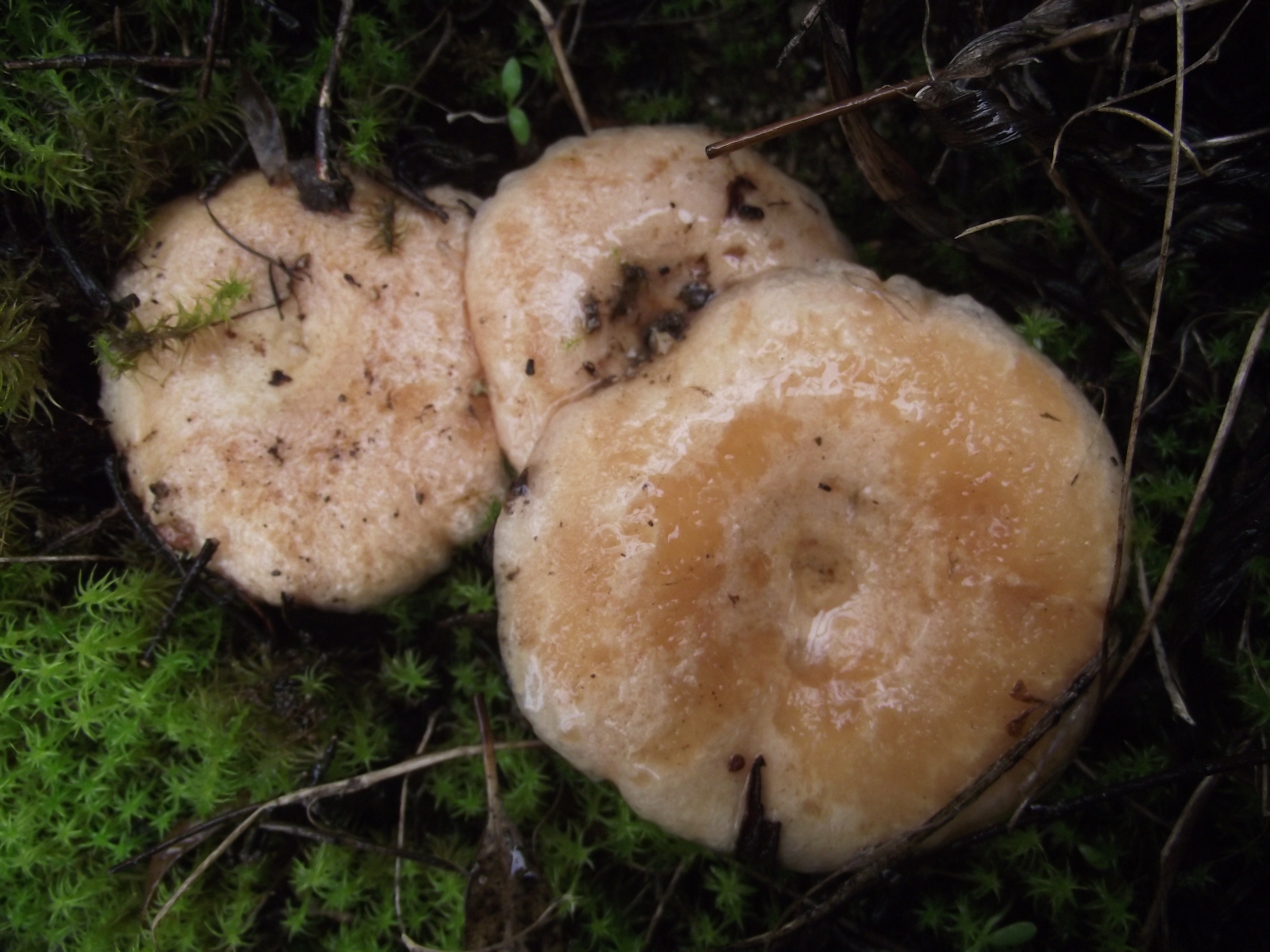

Scientific classification
- Domain: Eukaryota
- Kingdom: Fungi
- Division: Basidiomycota
- Class: Agaricomycetes
- Order: Russulales
- Family: Russulaceae
- Genus: Lactarius
- Species: L. tesquorum

Binomial name
- Lactarius tesquorum Malençon (1979)

= Lactarius tesquorum =

Species of fungus

Lactarius tesquorum is a member of the large milk-cap genus Lactarius in the order Russulales. It was described in 1979 by Georges Malençon based on collections from Morocco, but was later identified in other Mediterranean countries.

== See also ==
- List of Lactarius species
