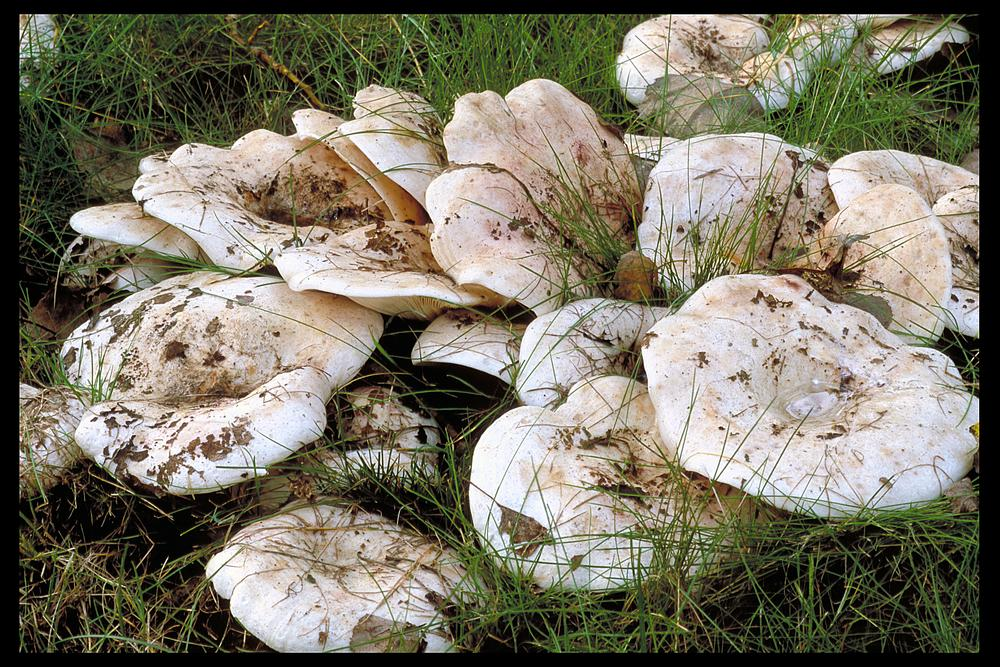

Conservation status
- Least Concern (IUCN 3.1)

Scientific classification
- Kingdom: Fungi
- Division: Basidiomycota
- Class: Agaricomycetes
- Order: Russulales
- Family: Russulaceae
- Genus: Lactarius
- Species: L. controversus

Binomial name
- Lactarius controversus (Pers.) (1800)

= Lactarius controversus =

Species of fungus

Lactarius controversus
- Mycological characteristics
- Gills on hymenium
- Cap is depressed
- Hymenium is decurrent
- Stipe is bare
- Spore print is white
- Ecology is mycorrhizal
- Edibility is inedible

Lactarius controversus, commonly known as the poplar milkcap, is a large funnel-capped fungus within the genus Lactarius, which are collectively known as 'milk caps'. They all exude milky drops (lactate) from the flesh and gills when damaged.

The species is classified as inedible but has sometimes been collected in Eurasia.

== Taxonomy ==
Accredited to Christian Hendrik Persoon, one of the fathers of mycology.

== Description ==
It is distinguishable mainly by rosy markings on the upper cap surface, often arranged in concentric rings, and its pinkish-buff gills. Like other fungi in the genus, it has crumbly, rather than fibrous, flesh, and when this is broken the fungus exudes a white milky latex. Mature specimens are funnel-shaped, with decurrent gills and a concave cap from 5 to 20 centimetres (2 to 8 in) in diameter. The stipe is up to 7 cm long. The flesh is firm and the spore print is creamy to pinkish.

=== Similar species ===
The species is similar to several white milk-caps in the genus Lactifluus which however are only distantly related: The 'fleecy milk-cap' Lactifluus vellereus, its sister species L. bertillonii, and the 'peppery milk-cap' L. piperatus all lack the pinkish gills and 'rosy' cap markings.

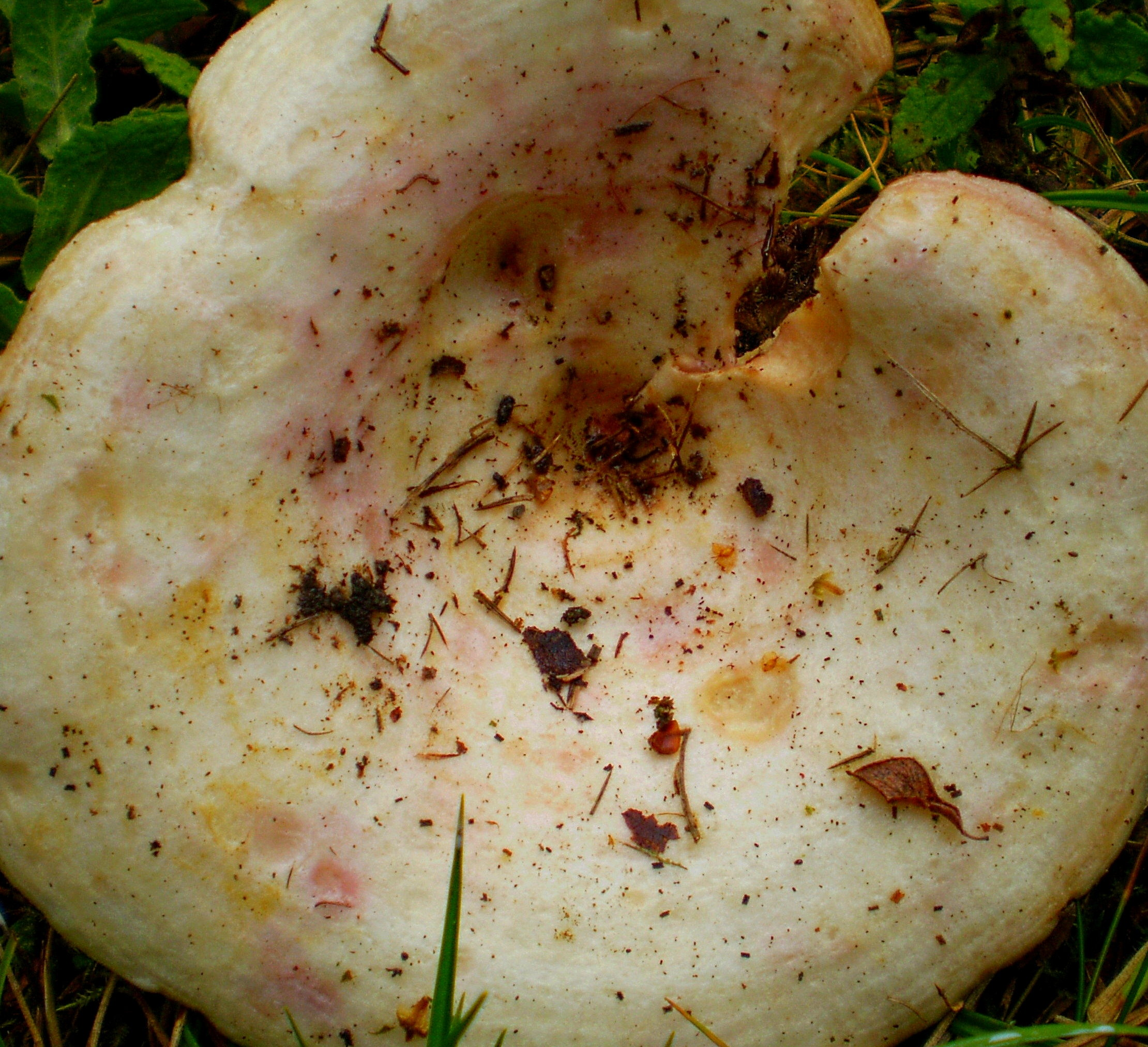
Close-up of cap

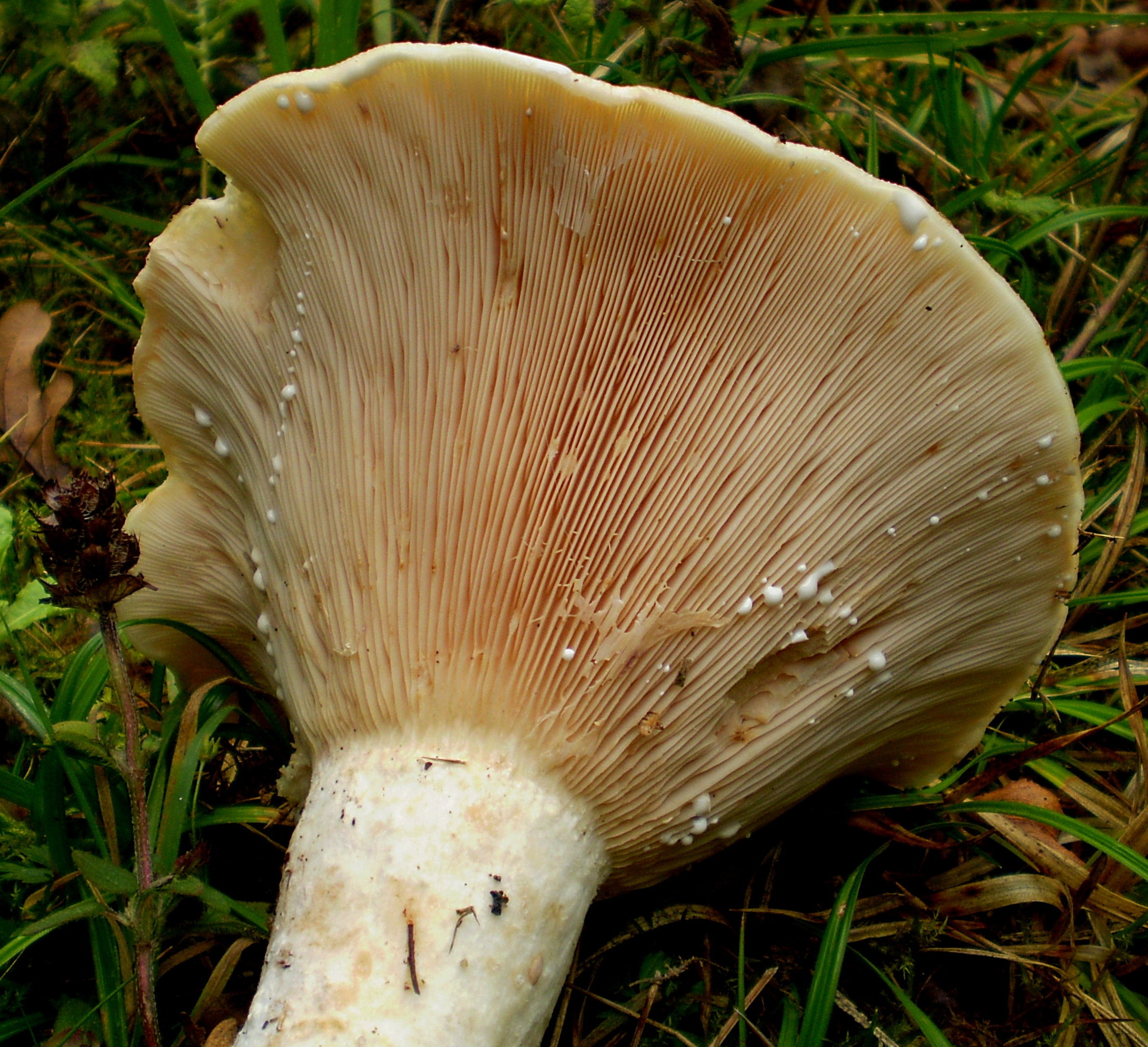
Cap underside

== Distribution and habitat ==
It is found in Europe, including Britain, and usually grows with species of Salix (goat willow or creeping willow) on heaths and moors. It is uncommon. It is widespread in North America growing with aspen, poplar, and willow. Found in the aspen forests of the Sierra Nevada, and has been noted in New Mexico.

== Edibility ==
The mushroom is considered inedible due to its very acrid taste (producing a burning sensation) , but is eaten and even commercially collected in southeastern European countries such as Serbia and Turkey.

== See also ==
- List of Lactarius species
