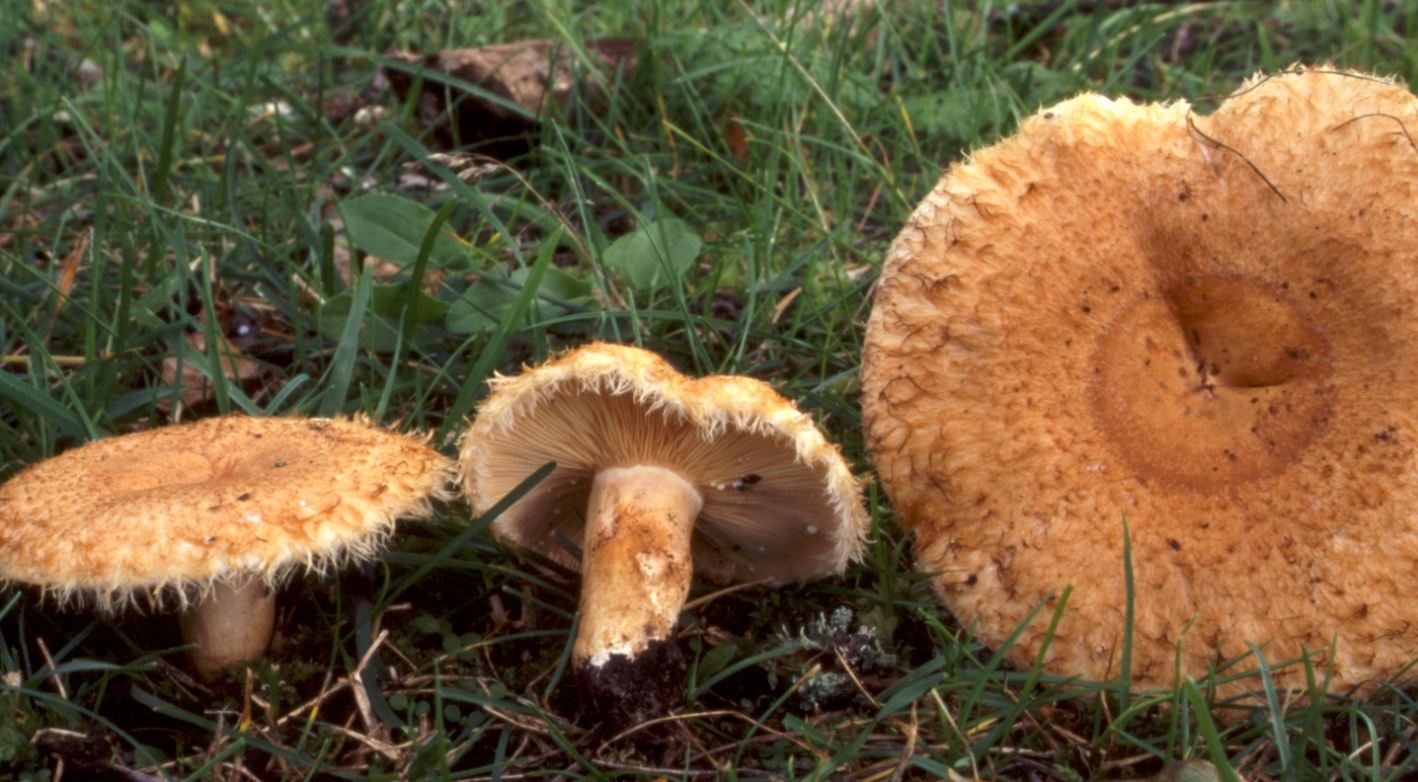
- In Gotland, Sweden

Scientific classification
- Domain: Eukaryota
- Kingdom: Fungi
- Division: Basidiomycota
- Class: Agaricomycetes
- Order: Russulales
- Family: Russulaceae
- Genus: Lactarius
- Species: L. mairei

Binomial name
- Lactarius mairei Malençon (1939)

= Lactarius mairei =

Species of fungus

Lactarius mairei is a member of the large milk-cap genus Lactarius in the order Russulales. Originally found in Morocco, it was described as new to science in 1939 by Georges Jean Louis Malençon.

== See also ==
- List of Lactarius species
