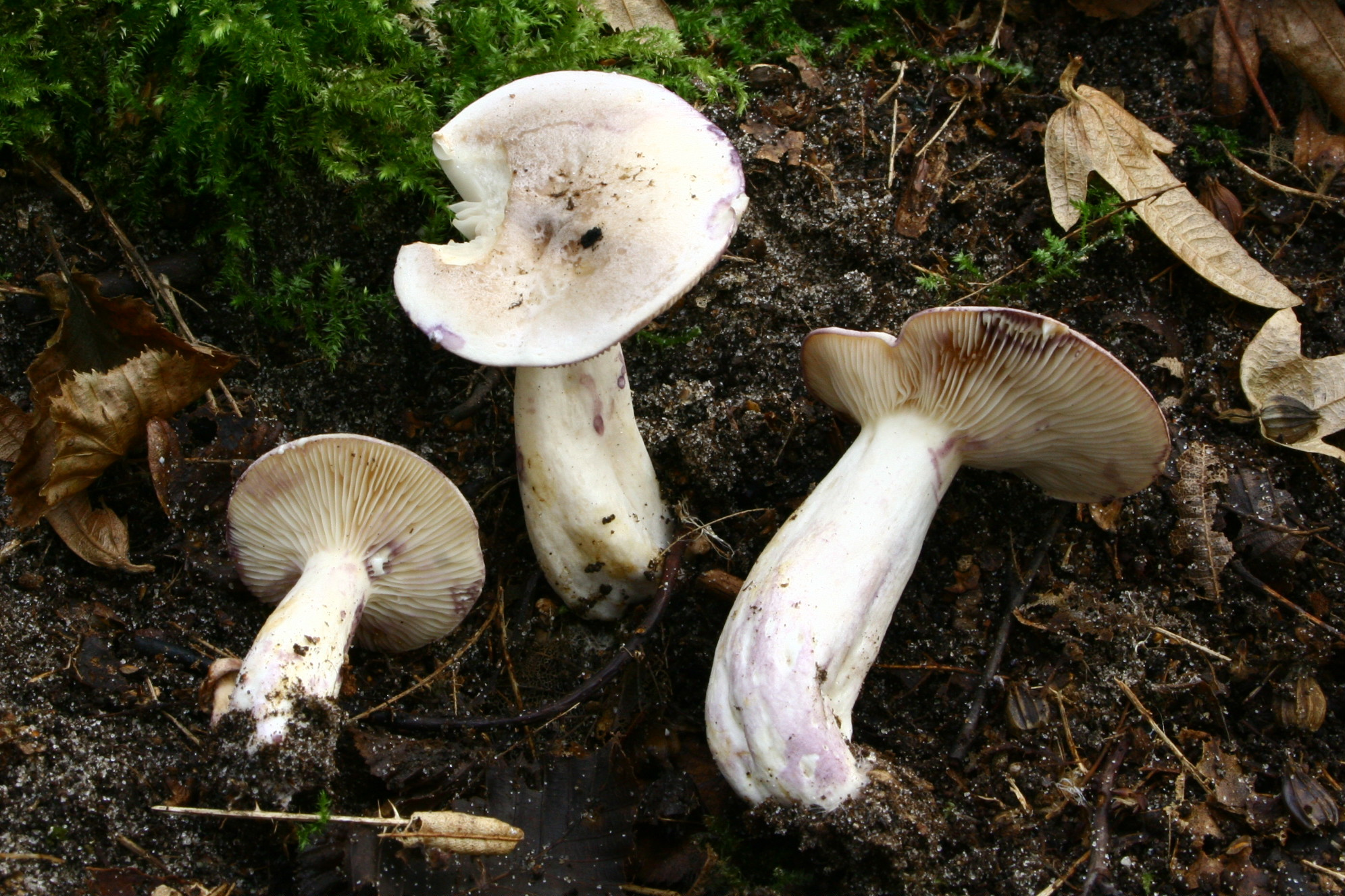

Conservation status
- Secure (NatureServe)

Scientific classification
- Kingdom: Fungi
- Division: Basidiomycota
- Class: Agaricomycetes
- Order: Russulales
- Family: Russulaceae
- Genus: Lactarius
- Species: L. uvidus

Binomial name
- Lactarius uvidus (Fr.) Fr. (1838)

Synonyms
- Agaricus lividorubescens Batsch (1789); Agaricus livens J.F.Gmel. (1792); Agaricus uvidus Fr. (1815); Galorrheus uvidus (Fr.) P.Kumm. (1871); Lactarius lividorubescens (Batsch) Burl. (1908)

= Lactarius uvidus =

Species of fungus

Lactarius uvidus Mycological characteristics
- Gills on hymenium
- Cap is flat or depressed
- Hymenium is subdecurrent
- Stipe is bare
- Spore print is white
- Ecology is mycorrhizal
- Edibility is unknown or poisonous

Lactarius uvidus, commonly known as the purple-staining milk cap. The cap is about 10 centimetres (4 in) wide and the stipe twice as long. The milk turns violet when the flesh is damaged.

The species can be found in Europe and North America. It may be poisonous.

== Taxonomy ==
Lactarius uvidus was first described by Swedish mycologist Elias Magnus Fries as Agaricus uvidus in 1818, before being given its current binomial name by the same author in 1838.

It gives its name to the section Uvidi within the genus Lactarius.

The fungi generally identified as L. uvidus are part of a complex of closely related species and varieties which are difficult to delimit definitively.

== Description ==
- The cap of up to about 10 centimetres (4 in) is beige or grey and often also has a lilac hue. It is flat-topped or sometimes becomes centrally depressed when older. The surface is greasy or viscous when damp.
- The gills are slightly decurrent and have a creamy colour, tending to become spotted violet by the milk where damaged.
- The milk is initially white and turns violet, but only if left in contact with the gills or flesh. The milk and the flesh taste slightly bitter.
- The pallid stipe grows up to about 8 cm high by 2 cm diameter, becoming hollow with age.

=== Related species ===
Lactarius uvidus belongs to section Uvidi of the genus, the members of which are characterized by milk which discolours violet, and by the greasy cap surface. These mushrooms are divided into two sub-sections: the Aspidieni, which have a whitish, ochre or greyish cap, and the Uvidini (including L. uvidus), which have a lilac, violaceous, or brownish cap.

Some less well-known but closely related European species are L. pseudouvidus Kühner (1985) (found in alpine zone, up to 4 cm in diameter, with ochraceous yellow gills), L. robertianus Bon (1985) (also alpine, darker coloured, with smell of cedar wood), and L. luridus (Pers.) Gray (1821) (whose milk goes a deep violet). Since L. uvidus seems to be a cluster of species, it is particularly difficult to identify the correspondence between descriptions and collections originating from either Europe or North America.

Some examples of varieties inside the main species are L. uvidus var. pallidus Bres. (which is whitish), and L. uvidus var. candidulus Neuh. (which is small and pale and comes in muddy places).

== Distribution and habitat ==
Distribution in Europe

This cluster of species is found in deciduous and coniferous woods, with a preference towards acidic soils. It has a wide distribution in Europe, North Africa, and North America, being fairly common in some regions but rare in others.

== Conservation ==
It appears classified as vulnerable or endangered in the Danish and Dutch Red Lists of Fungi.

== Toxicity ==
The species is generally thought to be poisonous due to the toxins it contains, but has also been classified as edible with reservations.

== See also ==
- List of Lactarius species
