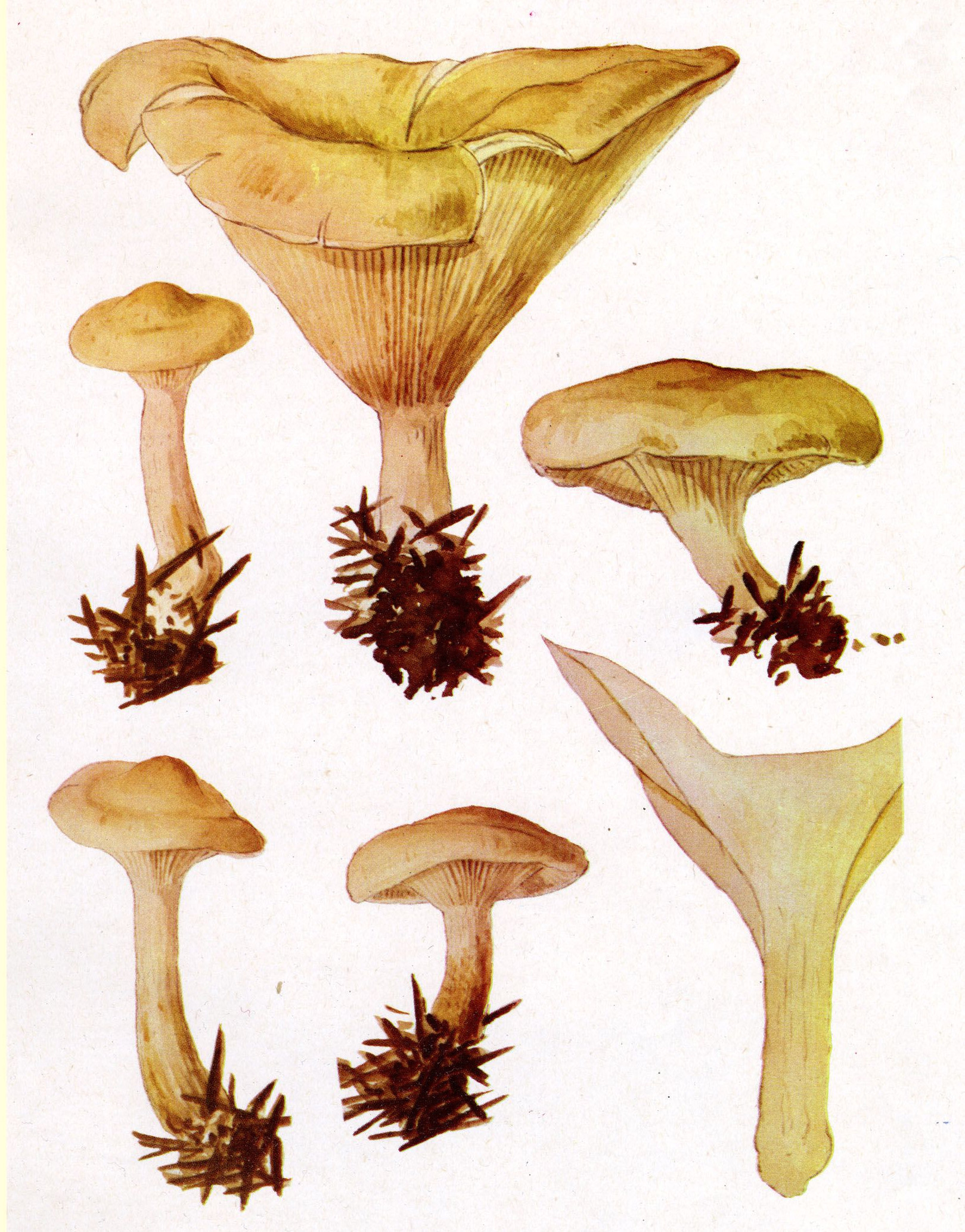
- Paralepistopsis amoenolens

Scientific classification
- Kingdom: Fungi
- Division: Basidiomycota
- Class: Agaricomycetes
- Order: Agaricales
- Family: Tricholomataceae
- Genus: Paralepistopsis; Vizzini (2012)

Type species
- Paralepistopsis amoenolens (Malençon) Vizzini (2012)

= Paralepistopsis =

Genus of fungi

Paralepistopsis is a genus of fungi in the family Tricholomataceae.

== Taxonomy ==
The Paralepistopsis genus was created in 2012 by the Italian mycologist Alfredo Vizzini to better classify two rare toxic species formerly located in the Clitocybe genus.

Clitocybe amoenolens found in Morocco and parts of South Europe and C. acromelalga from Asia were noted to have habits more similar to Paralepista flaccida (formerly Lepista flaccida) than to other Clitocybe species. Additionally the pileipellis and microscopic details of these species were distinct from others in the Clitocybe genus and related genera. Genetic sequencing placed these species close to Cleistocybe and Catathelasma genera.

The most important distinction for mushroom hunters however is the presence of toxic acromelic acids in these species which can present dangers when foraging for similar looking edible species in these locations. Acromelic acid A is a potent neurotoxin with a chemical formula of C_{13}H_{14}N_{2}O_{7} which is associated with causing paralysis and seizures

The type species, Paralepistopsis amoenolens was previously classified as Clitocybe amoenolens and is commonly known as the paralysis funnel due to the harmful effects caused by consuming it.

== Etymology ==
This genus name is in reference to its resemblance to Paralepista species.

== Species ==
As of July 2022, Index Fungorum accepted 2 species of Paralepistopsis.

- Paralepistopsis acromelalga
- Paralepistopsis amoenolens

== See also ==
- Clitocybe
- List of Tricholomataceae genera
