= Erythromelalgia =

Inflammation due to periodic blood vessel blockage

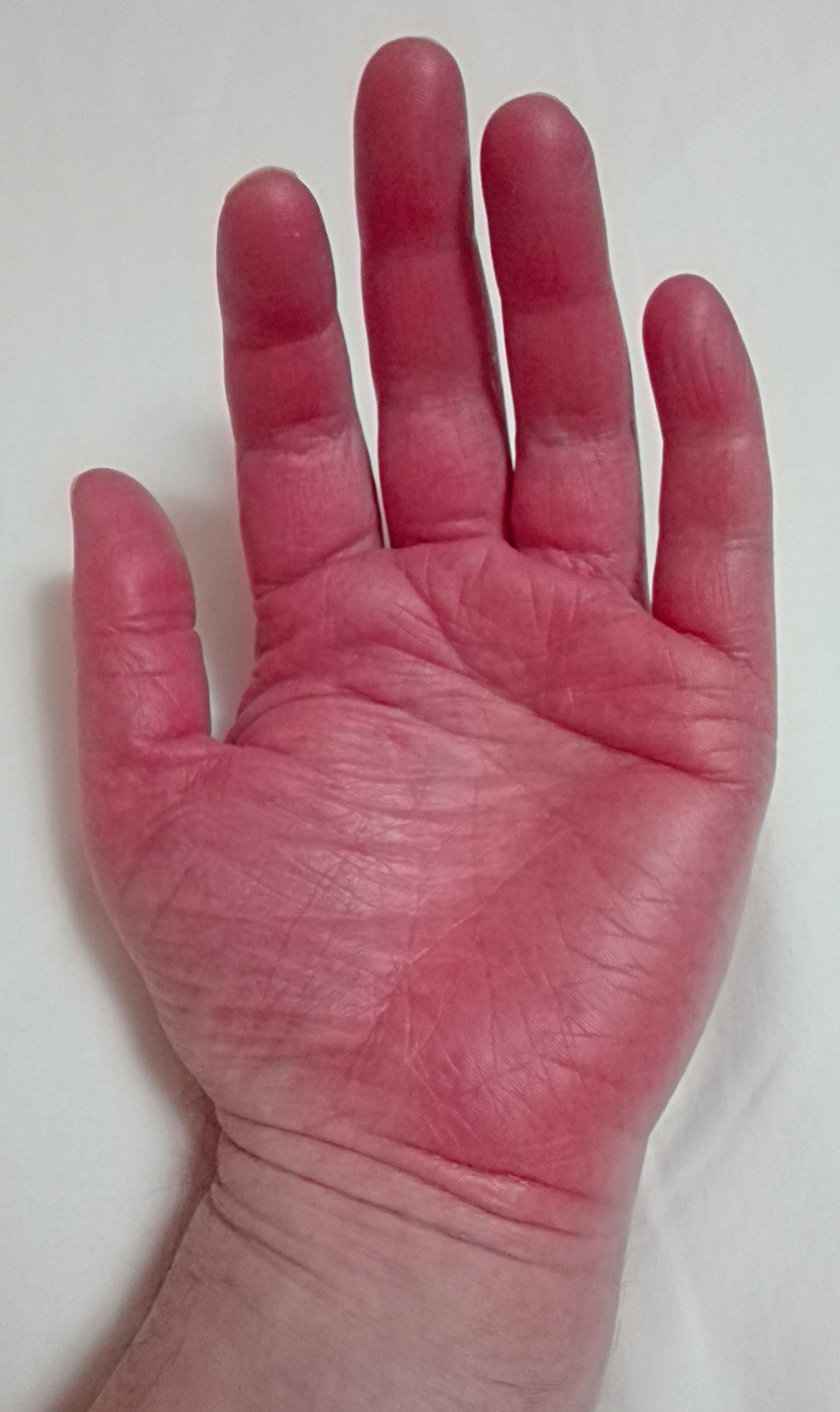
- Erythromelalgia in hands of a 52-year-old Scandinavian male after holding a book
- Specialty: Neuropathy
- Symptoms: episodic blockage of blood vessels, usually in the lower extremities or hands, hyperemia, Inflammation, severe burning pain (in the small fiber sensory nerves) and skin redness.
- Causes: small fiber peripheral neuropathy, polycythemia vera, essential thrombocythemia, stress, insomnia, hypercholesterolemia, mushroom or mercury poisoning, autoimmune disorders, mutation of the voltage-gated sodium channel α-subunit gene

Erythromelalgia, or Mitchell's disease (after Silas Weir Mitchell), is a rare vascular peripheral pain disorder in which blood vessels, usually in the lower extremities or hands, are episodically blocked (frequently on and off daily), then become hyperemic and inflamed. There is severe burning pain (in the small fiber sensory nerves) and skin redness. The attacks are periodic and are commonly triggered by heat, pressure, mild activity, exertion, insomnia or stress. Erythromelalgia may occur either as a primary or secondary disorder (i.e. a disorder in and of itself or a symptom of another condition). Secondary erythromelalgia can result from small fiber peripheral neuropathy of any cause, polycythemia vera, essential thrombocythemia, hypercholesterolemia, mushroom or mercury poisoning, and some autoimmune disorders. Primary erythromelalgia is caused by mutation of the voltage-gated sodium channel α-subunit gene SCN9A.

In 2004 erythromelalgia became the first human disorder in which it has been possible to associate an ion channel mutation with chronic neuropathic pain, when its link to the SCN9A gene was initially published in the Journal of Medical Genetics. Later that year, in an article in The Journal of Neuroscience, Cummins et al., demonstrated, using voltage clamp recordings, that these mutations enhanced the function of Na_{V}1.7 sodium channels, which are preferentially expressed within peripheral neurons. One year later, in an article in Brain, Dib-Hajj et al., demonstrated that Na_{V}1.7 mutants channels, from families with inherited erythromelalgia (IEM), make dorsal root ganglion (DRG, peripheral and sensory), neurons hyper excitable, thereby demonstrating the mechanistic link between these mutations and pain, thereby firmly establishing Na_{V}1.7 gain-of-function mutations as the molecular basis for IEM. Conversely, in December 2006 a University of Cambridge team reported an SCN9A mutation that resulted in a complete lack of pain sensation in a Pakistani child and some of his family members. He felt no pain, regularly performing 'street theatre' by "placing knives through his arms" and "[walking] on hot coals." By 2013, nearly a dozen gain-of-function mutations of Na_{V}1.7 had been linked to IEM. The multi-decades search which identified gene SCN9A as the cause of inherited erythromelalgia is documented in a book by Stephen Waxman, Chasing Men on Fire: The Story of the Search for a Pain Gene.

== Classification ==
Primary erythromelalgia may be classified as either familial or sporadic, with the familial form inherited in an autosomal dominant manner. Both of these may be further classified as either juvenile or adult onset. The juvenile onset form occurs prior to age 20 and frequently prior to age 10. While the genetic cause of the juvenile and sporadic adult onset forms is often known, this is not the case for the adult onset familial form.

In rural areas of southern China, outbreaks of erythromelalgia have occurred during winter and spring at 3–5 year intervals among secondary school students. This epidemic form of erythromelalgia has been viewed as a different form of non-inherited primary erythromelalgia and affects mainly teenage girls in middle schools. The disease is characterized by burning pain in the toes and soles of the feet, accompanied by foot redness, congestion, and edema; a few patients may have fever, palpitations, headache, and joint pain. In the 1987 epidemic in Hubei, 60.6% of patients had a common cold before the onset of erythromelalgia and 91.2% had pharyngitis.

== Signs and symptoms ==
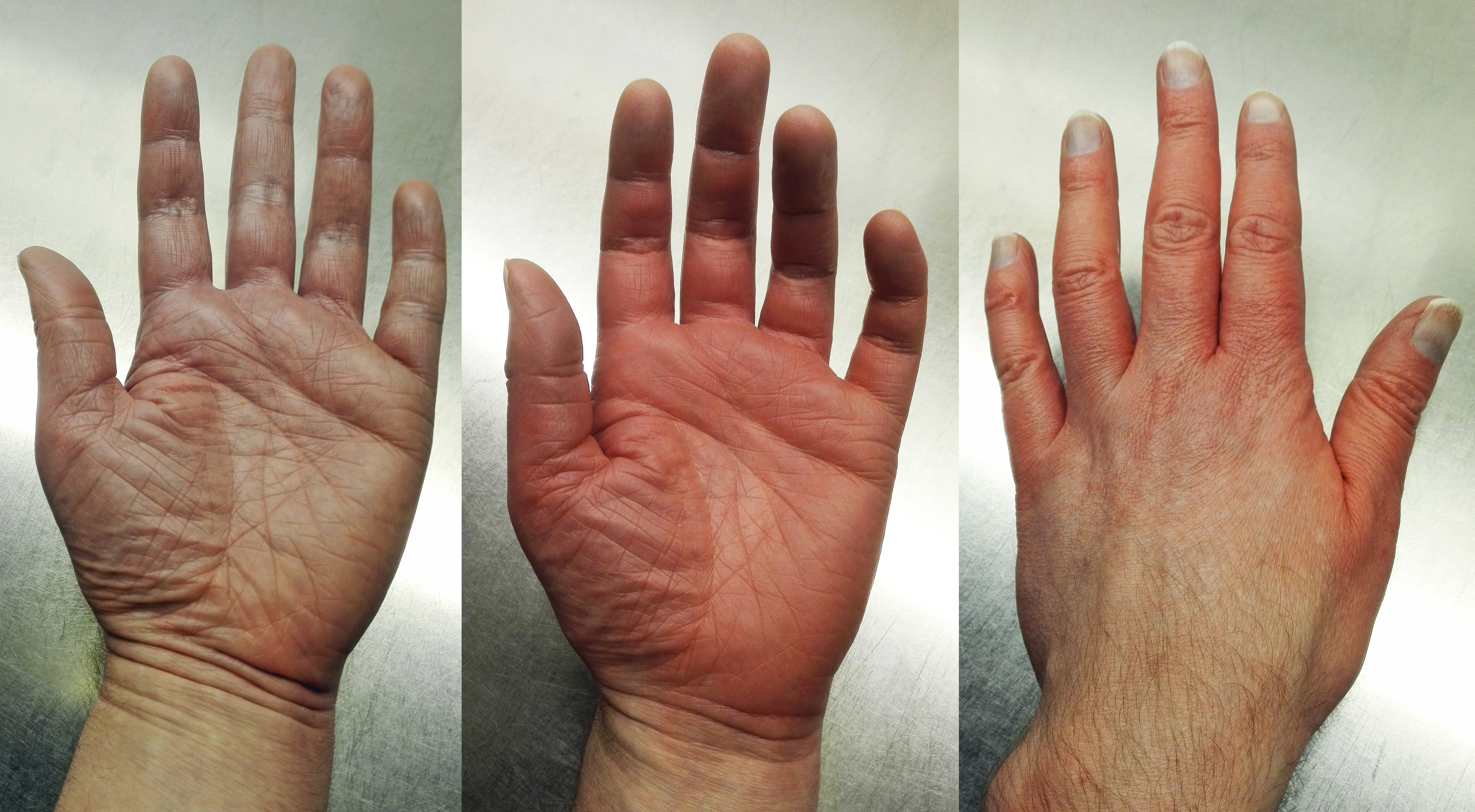
Erythromelalgia in left hand, both back and front

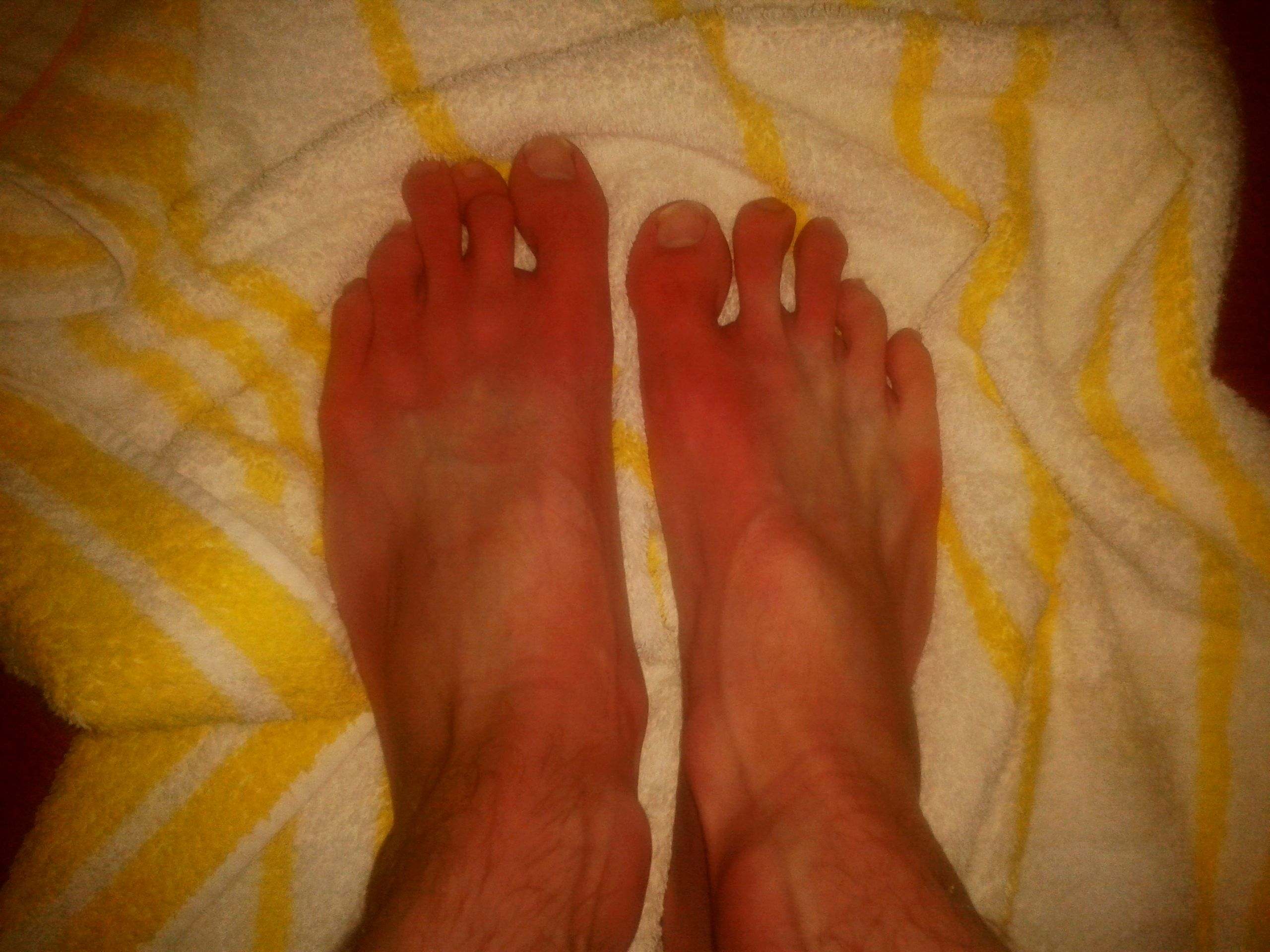
Erythromelalgia in toes during a flareup

The most prominent symptoms of erythromelalgia are episodes of erythema, swelling, a painful deep-aching of the soft tissue (usually either radiating or shooting) and tenderness, along with a painful burning sensation primarily in the extremities. These symptoms are often symmetric and affect the lower extremities more frequently than the upper extremities. Symptoms may also affect the ears and face. For secondary erythromelalgia, attacks typically precede and are precipitated by the underlying primary condition. For primary erythromelalgia, attacks can last from an hour to months at a time and occur infrequently to frequently with multiple times daily. Attacks most frequently occur at night, thus having the potential to greatly interfere with sleep. Common triggers for daytime episodes are exertion, heating of the affected extremities, and alcohol or caffeine consumption, and any pressure applied to the limbs. In some patients sugar and even melon consumption have also been known to provoke attacks. Many of those with primary erythromelalgia avoid wearing shoes or socks as the heat this generates is known to produce erythromelalgia attacks. The coexistence of erythromelalgia and Raynaud's phenomenon is rare, but case studies of patients with both diagnoses have been reported in medical journals. Symptoms may present gradually and incrementally, sometimes taking years to become intense enough for patients to seek medical care. In other cases symptoms emerge full blown with onset.

Epidemic erythromelalgia is characterized by burning pain in the toes and soles of the feet, accompanied by foot redness, congestion, and edema; a few patients may have fever, palpitations, headache, and joint pain. In the 1987 epidemic in Hubei, 60.6% of patients had a common cold before the onset of erythromelalgia and 91.2% had pharyngitis.

== Cause ==
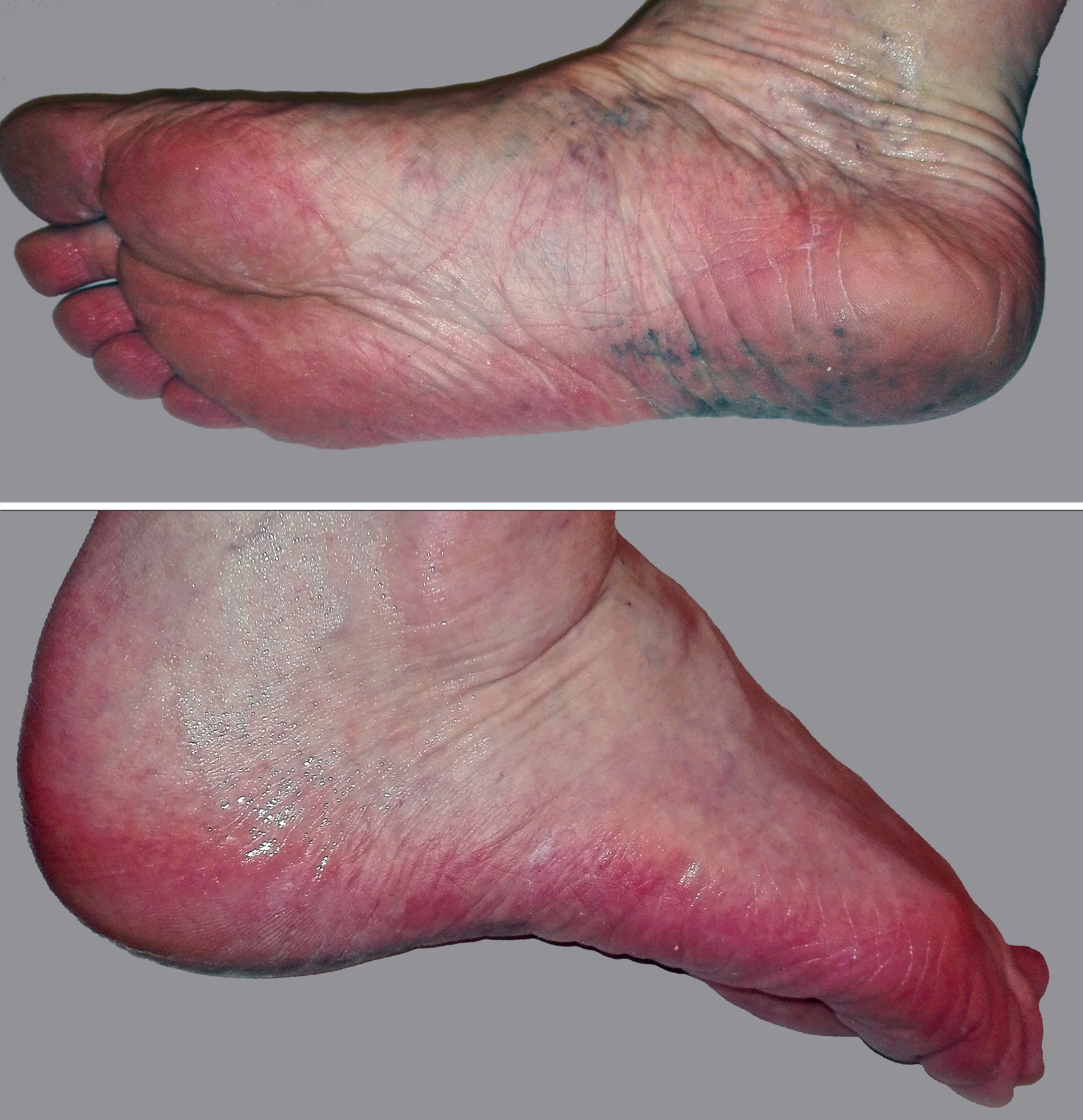
EM episode in a foot triggered by dipping it in warm water. The EM in this case is caused by an underlaying small fiber neuropathy.

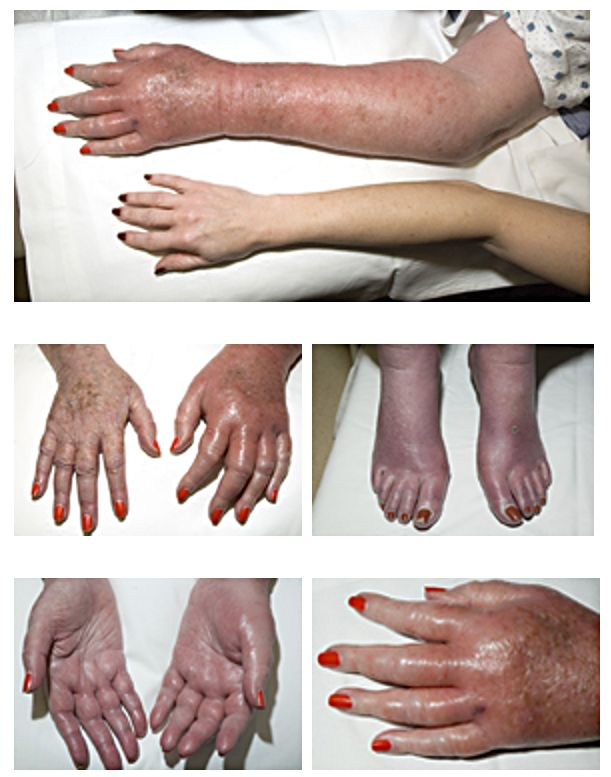
Erythromelalgia present in a patient with longstanding polycythemia vera. Note reddish limbs and swelling.

In general, erythromelalgia seems to consist of neuropathological and microvascular alterations. How this occurs in secondary erythromelalgia is poorly understood and may be specific to the underlying primary condition. Primary conditions that have been shown to elicit erythromelalgia are listed in diagnosis, below.

Primary erythromelalgia is a better understood autosomal dominant disorder. The neuropathological symptoms of primary erythromelalgia arise from hyperexcitability of C-fibers in the dorsal root ganglion. Specifically, nociceptors (neurons responsible for the sensation and conduction of painful stimuli) appear to be the primarily affected neurons in these fibers. This hyperexcitability results in the severe burning pain experienced by patients. While the neuropathological symptoms are a result of hyperexcitability, microvascular alterations in erythromelalgia are due to hypoexcitability. The sympathetic nervous system controls cutaneous vascular tone and altered response of this system to stimuli such as heat likely results in the observed microvascular symptoms. In both cases, these changes in excitability are typically due to mutation of the sodium channel Na_{V}1.7. These differences in excitability alterations between the sympathetic nervous system and nociceptors is due to different expression of sodium channels other than Na_{V}1.7 in them.

What causes epidemic erythromelalgia in southern China remains unknown although several erythromelalgia-associated poxviruses were isolated from throat swabs of several patients at different counties and from two different seasons.

=== Side effect of medication ===
Several medications, including verapamil and nifedipine, as well as ergot derivatives such as bromocriptine and pergolide, have been associated with medication-induced erythromelalgia.

=== Mushroom poisoning ===
The consumption of two species of related fungi, Clitocybe acromelalga from Japan, and Clitocybe amoenolens from France, has led to several cases of mushroom-induced erythromelalgia which lasted from 8 days to 5 months.

=== Possible infectious cause ===
An epidemic form of this syndrome occurs in secondary school students in rural areas of China. A large epidemic erythromelalgia was occurred in Hubei province of China in 1987 and the disease was characterized by burning pain in the toes and soles of the feet, accompanied by foot redness, congestion, and edema; a few patients had fever, palpitations, headache, and joint pain. 60.6% of patients had a common cold before the onset of erythromelalgia and 91.2% had pharyngitis. Subsequently, a virus—erythromelalgia-related poxvirus (ERPV)—was repeatedly isolated from throat swabs of six separate patients from two different counties and Wuhan city in Hubei province. The genome of this virus has been sequenced and it appears that this virus is related to a strain of mousepox. Serological characterization can easily distinguish human ERPV from ectromelia virus and vaccinia virus by cross-neutralization and plaque reduction assays

Since this virus has not yet been isolated from other outbreaks in other parts of southern China to date this putative association needs to be further investigated. The finding of the specific antibody conversion to ATIs of ERPV in patients' paired sera strengthens the evidence for a possible aetiological role of human ERPV in epidemic erythromelalgia.

== Pathophysiology ==
There are 10 known mutations in the voltage-gated sodium channel α-subunit Na_{V}1.7 encoding gene, SCN9A. This channel is expressed primarily in nociceptors of the dorsal root ganglion and the sympathetic ganglion neurons. Nine of these mutations have received further study and they have all shown to result in similar biophysical alterations, Table 1. As can be seen from table 1, the primary effect of erythromelalgia mutations is Na_{V}1.7 channels that activate at more hyperpolarized potentials. Na_{V}1.7 channels act largely as threshold sensors and initiate action potentials. Consequently, this shift in their activation profile results in channels that open closer to the resting membrane potential. In many mutations, this shift of activation is accompanied by shifts in the voltage sensitivity of fast and/or slow inactivation, often in the depolarized direction. These gain-of-function mutations in Na_{V}1.7 channels cause them to open more easily and stay open longer, resulting in hyperexcitability of the dorsal root ganglion (DRG) nociceptive neurons, which significantly lowers the pain threshold and produces the burning pain. {{|date=November 2025}}

Some of these mutant channels have been expressed in dorsal root ganglion (DRG) or sympathetic neurons. In DRG neurons expressing the F1449V mutation, a lower threshold is required for action potential creation (93.1 ± 12.0 pA) than those expressing wild-type channels (124.1 ± 7.4 pA). Furthermore, while DRG neurons expressing wild-type channels only respond with a few action potentials, those expressing F1449V channels respond with a high-frequency train of action potentials. There is a similar effect in DRG neurons expressing the L858H and A863P mutants. Here, there is also a notable change in resting membrane potential, being depolarized by 4-7 mV versus wild-type channel expressing cells. The situation is different, however, in sympathetic neurons expressing the L858H mutation. While L858H expressing sympathetic ganglion are depolarized ~5mV relative to wild-type expressing neurons, their threshold for action potential initiation is notably higher. Furthermore, while current injection of 40pA for 950ms provokes an average of 6 action potentials in sympathetic neurons expressing wild-type channels this stimulation evokes only approximately 2 action potentials with reduced overshoots in sympathetic neurons expressing L858H mutant channels. Further investigation has demonstrated that the differences in response between DRG and sympathetic neurons is due to expression of Na_{V}1.8 in the former. Consequently, expression of Na_{V}1.8 channels in sympathetic neurons also expressing L858H mutant Na_{V}1.7 results in neurons with a depolarized resting membrane potential that nevertheless have a normal action potential threshold and overshoot.

An effective, though not recommended, treatment for erythromelalgia symptoms is cooling of the affected area. Activation of wild-type channels is unaffected by cooling. L858F mutant channels, however, are activated at more depolarized potentials when cooled than at normal body temperature. At 16 °C the activation V_{½} of the mutant channel is only 4.6 mV more hyperpolarized that wild-type versus 9.6 mV more hyperpolarized at 35 °C. Fast inactivation is affected in a similar manner in both wild-type and L858F mutant channel and is, thus, unlikely to contribute to symptom resolution due to cooling. While such cooling is unlikely to affect neuronal cell bodies, axons and termini express Na_{V}1.7 and are present in the skin.

Table 1. Summary of mutations Na_{V}1.7 associated with primary erythromelalgia
| Mutation | Region | Shift of activation V_{½} | Shift of inactivation (fast and/or slow) V_{½} | Other effects | References |
|---|---|---|---|---|---|
| I136V | D1S1 | | | | |
| F216S | D1S4 | Hyperpolarized | Hyperpolarized | Faster entry into fast-inactivation | |
| S241T | D1S4-5 | Hyperpolarized | Hyperpolarized | | |
| N395K | D1S6 | Hyperpolarized | Depolarized | Creation of a large window current, decreased lidocaine sensitivity | |
| I848T | D2S4-5 | Hyperpolarized | | Slowed deactivation and inactivation | |
| L858F | D2S4-5 | Hyperpolarized | Depolarized | Slowed deactivation, faster recovery from inactivation, cooling depolarizes activation and hyperpolarizes inactivation V_{½} | |
| L858H | D2S4-5 | Hyperpolarized | | Slowed deactivation, enhanced slow inactivation, | |
| A863P | D2S5 | Hyperpolarized | Depolarized | Creation of a window current, slowed deactivation | |
| F1449V | D3-4 | Hyperpolarized | | | |
| A1632G | D4 | Hyperpolarized | Depolarized | Increased spontaneous firing | |
Region nomenclature: DA-B, linker between domains A and B; DASB, transmembrane segment B in domain A; and DASB-C, the linker between transmembrane segments B and C in domain A.

== Diagnosis ==
Erythromelalgia is a difficult condition to diagnose as there are no specific tests available. However, reduced capillary density has been observed microscopically during flaring; and reduced capillary perfusion is noted in the patient. Another test that can be done is to have the patient elevate their legs, and note the reversal (from red to pale) in skin color. Tests done at universities include quantitative sensory nerve testing, laser evoked potentials, sweat testing and epidermal sensory nerve fiber density test (which is an objective test for small fiber sensory neuropathy). Due to the aforementioned factors, patients may face delays in diagnosis.

Once it has been established that it is not secondary erythromelalgia—see below—a programme of management can be put in place. Some diseases present with symptoms similar to erythromelalgia. Complex regional pain syndrome (CRPS), for instance, presents with severe burning pain and redness except these symptoms are often unilateral (versus symmetric) and may be proximal instead of purely or primarily distal. Furthermore, attacks triggered by heat and resolved by cooling are less common with CRPS.

Erythromelalgia is sometimes caused by other disorders. A partial list of diseases known to precipitate erythromelalgia is below.

- Myeloproliferative disease
- Hypercholesterolemia
- Autoimmune disorder
- Small fiber peripheral neuropathy
- Fabry's disease
- Mercury poisoning
- Mushroom poisoning
- Obstructive sleep apnea
- Sciatica
- Some medications, such as fluoroquinolones, bromocriptine, pergolide, verapamil, and ticlopidine

== Treatment ==
For secondary erythromelalgia, treatment of the underlying primary disorder is the most primary method of treatment. Although aspirin has been thought to reduce symptoms of erythromelalgia, it is rare to find evidence that this is effective. Mechanical cooling of the limbs by elevating them can help or managing the ambient environment frequently is often necessary constantly as flares occur due to sympathetic autonomic dysfunction of the capillaries. The pain that accompanies it is severe and treated separately (the pain is similar to CRPS, phantom limb or thalamic pain syndrome). Patients are strongly advised not to place the affected limbs in cold water to relieve symptoms when flaring occurs. It may seem a good idea, but it precipitates problems further down the line causing damage to the skin and ulceration often intractable due to the damaged skin. A possible reduction in skin damage may be accomplished by enclosing the flaring limb in a commonly available, thin, heat transparent, water impermeable, plastic food storage bag. The advice of a physician is advised depending on specific circumstances.

Primary erythromelalgia management is symptomatic, i.e. treating painful symptoms only. Specific management tactics include avoidance of attack triggers such as: heat, change in temperature, exercise or over exertion, alcohol and spicy foods. This list is by no means comprehensive as there are many triggers to set off a 'flaring' episode that are inexplicable. Whilst a cool environment is helpful in keeping the symptoms in control, the use of cold water baths is strongly discouraged. In pursuit of added relief sufferers can inadvertently cause tissue damage or death, i.e. necrosis. See comments at the end of the preceding paragraph regarding possible effectiveness of plastic food storage bags to avoid/reduce negative effects of submersion in cold water baths.

One clinical study has demonstrated the efficacy of IV lidocaine or oral mexilitine, though differences between the primary and secondary forms were not studied. Another trial has shown promise for misoprostol, while other have shown that gabapentin, venlafaxine and oral magnesium may also be effective, but no further testing was carried out as newer research superseded this combination.

Strong anecdotal evidence from EM patients shows that a combination of drugs such as duloxetine and pregabalin is an effective way of reducing the stabbing pains and burning sensation symptoms of erythromelalgia in conjunction with the appropriate analgesia. In some cases, antihistamines may give some relief. Most people with erythromelalgia never go into remission and the symptoms are ever present at some level, whilst others get worse, or the EM is eventually a symptom of another disease such as systemic scleroderma.

Some suffering with EM are prescribed ketamine topical creams as a way of managing pain on a long-term basis. Feedback from some EM patients has led to reduction in usage as they believe it is only effective for short periods. Living with erythromelalgia can result in a deterioration in quality of life resulting in the inability to function in a work place, lack of mobility, depression, and is socially alienating; much greater education of medical practitioners is needed. As with many rare diseases, many people with EM end up taking years to get a diagnosis and to receive appropriate treatment. Research into the genetic mutations continues but there is a paucity of clinical studies focusing on living with erythromelalgia. There is much urgency within pharmaceutical companies to provide a solution to those who suffer with pain such as that with erythromelalgia.

=== Pain relief ===
Patients find relief by cooling the skin. All patients must be notified to not apply ice directly on to the skin, since this can cause maceration of the skin, nonhealing ulcers, infection, necrosis, and even amputation in severe cases.

Mild sufferers may find sufficient pain relief with tramadol or amitriptyline. Sufferers of more severe and widespread EM symptoms, however, may obtain relief only from opioid drugs. Opana ER has been found to be effective for many in the US, whilst in the UK slow-release morphine has proved to be effective. These powerful and potentially-addictive drugs may be prescribed to patients only after they have tried almost every other type of analgesia to no avail. (This delay in appropriate pain management can be a result of insurer-mandated or legally-required step therapy, or merely overly-cautious prescribing on the part of sufferers' doctors.)

The combination of Cymbalta (duloxetine) and Lyrica (pregabalin) has also proven to be useful in controlling pain, but many EM patients have found this combination has side effects that they are unable to tolerate.

== Epidemiology ==
Only a small number of studies that have investigated the prevalence of EM, with four studies conducted to date. The mean of all the studies combined results in an EM estimation incidence of 4.7/100,000 with a mean of 1 : 3.7 of the male to female ratio, respectively.

In 1997 there was a study conducted in Norway that estimated that the annual incidence of 2/100,000, with a 1 : 2.4 male to female ratio in this study population, respectively. In 2009 there was a population-based study of EM in the USA (Olmsted County, Minnesota), that reported that the annual incidence was 1.3/100,000, with a 1 : 5.6 male to female ratio in this study population, respectively. The incidence in this study of primary and secondary EM was 1.1 : 0.2 per 100 000 people per year, respectively. A study of a single centre in the south of Sweden in 2012, showed the overall annual population-based incidence was 0.36/100,000. In New Zealand (Dunedin) a study estimated that in 2013 the incidence of EM is 15/100,000, with a 1 : 3 male to female ratio in this study population, respectively. This last study has an estimation that is at least ten times higher than the prevalence previously reported. This study recruited individuals based on self-identification of symptoms (after self-identification, patients were invited for an assessment of an EM diagnosis), instead of participants that are identified through secondary and tertiary referrals as in the other studies.

There was a study done in 2013 where two Vietnamese patients were diagnosed with primary erythromelalgia. Patient A was a 33-year old female diagnosed with primary erythromelalgia at age 30 and suffered from burning and pain in her feet since she was 8 years old (Wu et al. 2013). Patient B was a 16 year-old girl with recurrent severe burning pain of both feet since the age of seven (Wu et al. 2013). A genetic analysis was performed where scientists observed three missense mutations, one familial and two sporadic mutations. The familial mutation changed isoleucine to valine and two missense mutations occurred where a "T" was changed to "C" (Wu et al. 2013). The three mutants involved in the gene were I136V, 1848T, and V1316A (Wu et al. 2013). The study showed that at higher temperatures, the hypersensitivity of the mutant channels were accentuated resulting in disease phenotype such as neuralgia (Wu et al. 2013).

=== Prevalence in China ===
Epidemic EM appears quite common in female middle school students of southern China, most likely due to a sharp decline in temperature following by a rapid increase of temperature. It has been postulated that epidemic erythromelalgia might be related to a poxvirus (ERPV) infection. The disease was characterized by burning pain in the toes and soles of the feet, accompanied by foot redness, congestion, and edema; a few patients had fever, palpitations, headache, and joint pain. 60.6% of patients had a common cold before the onset of erythromelalgia and 91.2% had pharyngitis. For temperature-related theory, the acral (foot and hand) small superficial arteries intensely constrict and dilate during the sharp decline of temperature, whereas a sharp increase of temperature, the intense expansion of capillaries irritate the nerve endings around, and thus lead to syndromes including (first and second degree) burning pain, increased temperature, erythema and swelling.

== History ==
The first reported case was in 1878 by Silas Weir Mitchell who suggested the term erythromelalgia to describe a syndrome of red congestion and burning pain in the hands and feet.

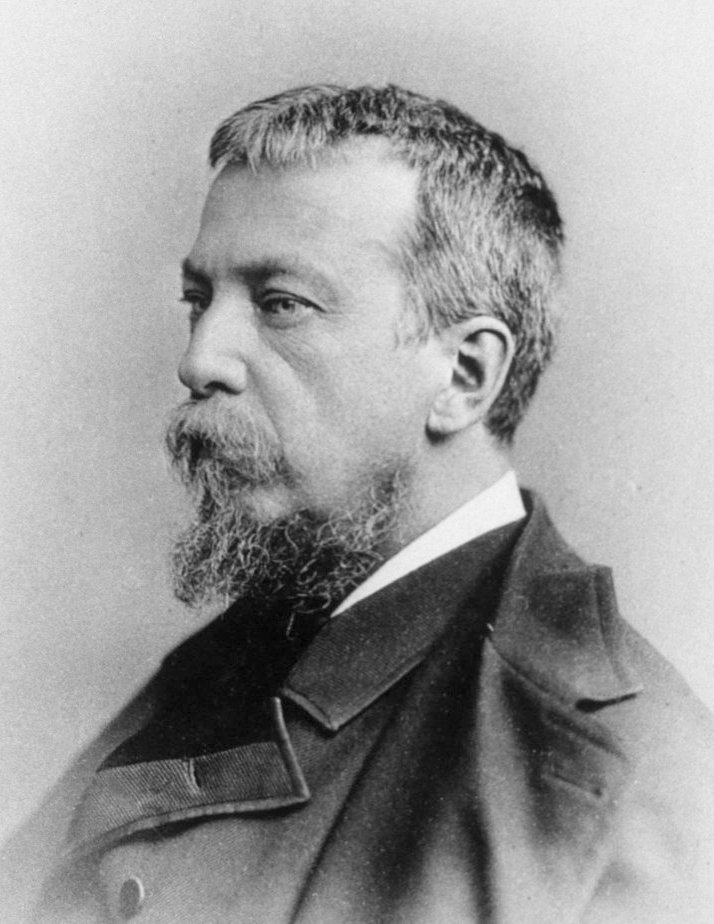
Silas Weir Mitchell

He distinguished it from the painful red limbs seen in some patients with gout or rheumatoid arthritis. It is derived from the Greek words erythros ("red"), melos ("limb") and algos ("pain").

Some confusion was introduced when Smith and Allen suggested changing the name to erythermalgia in order to emphasise the symptoms of painful inflammation and warmth. In their paper they showed for the first time that when their patients used aspirin, this promptly relieved the burning pain for about three days. They also suggested a distinction between primary (idiopathic) erythromelalgia and secondary erythromelalgia (due to underlying neurologic, hematologic, or vascular problems).

In 1994 Drenth, van Genderen and Michiels distinguished between erythromelalgia and erythermalgia on the basis of responsiveness to aspirin. They established three categories: erythromelalgia (platelet-mediated and aspirin-sensitive), primary erythermalgia, and secondary erythermalgia.

Because of the confusion in terminology, Norton and Zager and Grady classified erythromelalgia in 1998 as either: primary/idiopathic erythromelalgia or secondary erythromelalgia. The primary/idiopathic form of erythromelalgia is not associated with any other disease process and can be either early onset (in children) or adult onset. In their paper they described secondary erythromelalgia as being associated with another disease, often related to a myeloproliferative disorder and has also seen cases of: hypertension, diabetes mellitus, rheumatoid arthritis, gout, systemic lupus erythematosus, multiple sclerosis, astrocytoma of the brain, vasculitis, and pernicious anemia.

The following table shows the history of the nomenclature of Erythromelalgia:

| Suggested name | Author(s) and year |
|---|---|
| Erythromelalgia | Silas Weir Mitchell in 1878 |
| Gerhardt's disease | Carl Gerhardt in 1892 |
| Erythralgia | Thomas Lewis in 1933 |
| Erythermalgia | L.A. Smith and F.N. Allen in 1938 |
| Acromelalgia | J. Huizinga in 1957 |

=== Amputation ===
Because of the severity of the pain in erythromelalgia, and the lack of good pain medication then, there have been reports dating back to 1903 of amputation of the affected limb. In 1903 H. Batty Shaw reported that in three cases the pain was so severe, and that the affected extremities so useless, that amputation was performed.

=== Differences with Raynaud's disease ===
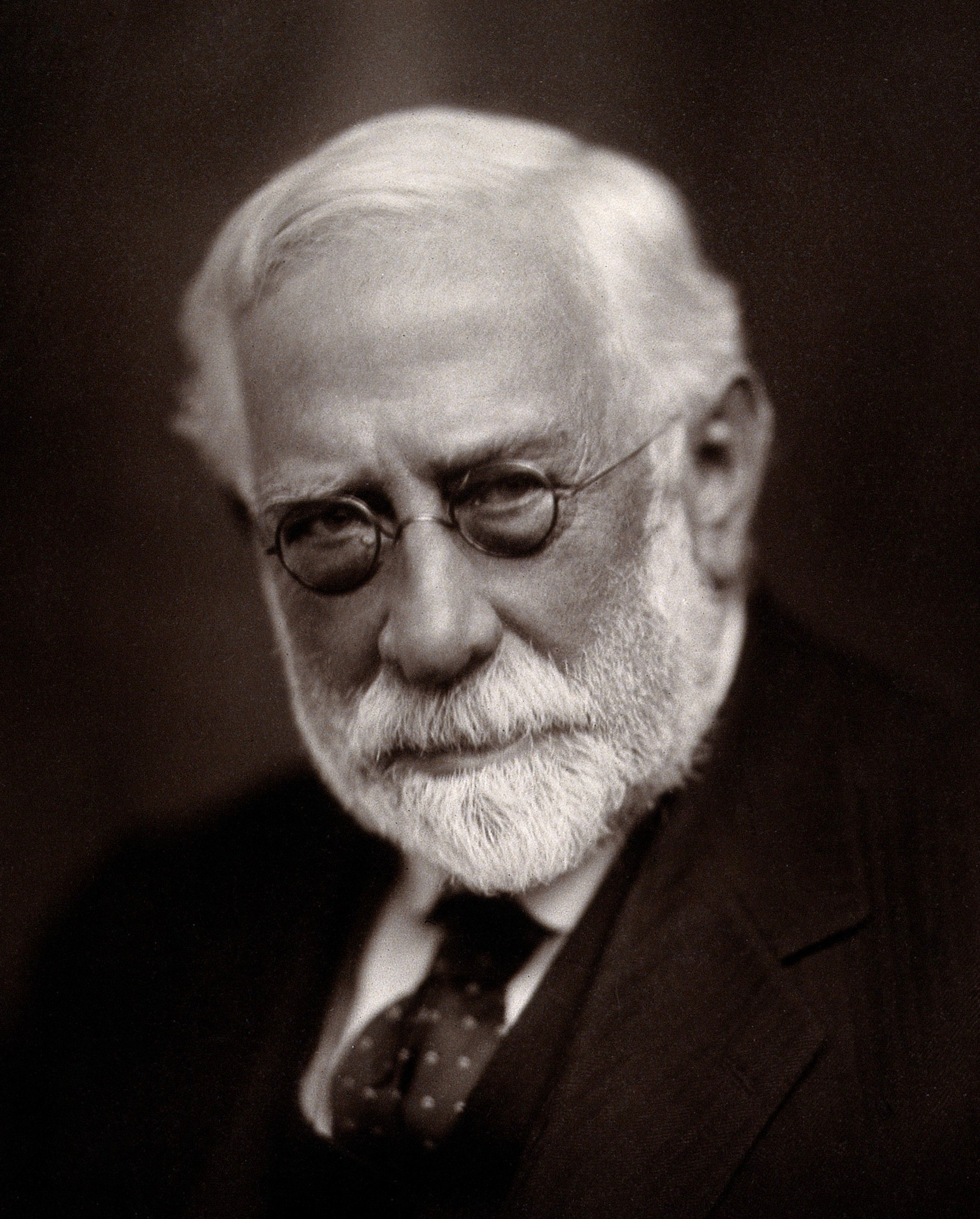
Sir Thomas Barlow

Back in 1899 Thomas Barlow had already summarized with great detail the contrast between erythromelalgia and Raynaud's disease as following:

Dependence produces considerable increase of the dusky red or violaceous tint of the extremity affected; the arteries in this position of the limb may pulsate forcibly; pain is common, sometimes constant, and more especially when the limb is dependent or parts pressed upon; in wintry weather, or on the application of cold, the conditions are relieved; on the other hand, warmth and summer weather increases pain; there is no loss of sensation, but there may be increased sensitiveness; the local temperature of the affected parts may be raised or lowered; gangrene does not occur; the affection is asymmetrical; there is a certain amount of swelling, sometimes allowing pitting on pressure, sometimes not; incisions over such swelling, even down to the bone, have proved useless; excessive pain on pressure upon the nerves supplying the parts affected is not found; muscular wasting is found, but explainable by the disuse of the limb, and is not at all as severe as in cases of disease of the peripheral nerves; a reaction of degeneration in the nerves of the affected parts has not been found; the deep reflexes, with few exceptions, are not reduced.
