= Franz von Rinecker =

German pharmacologist and physician

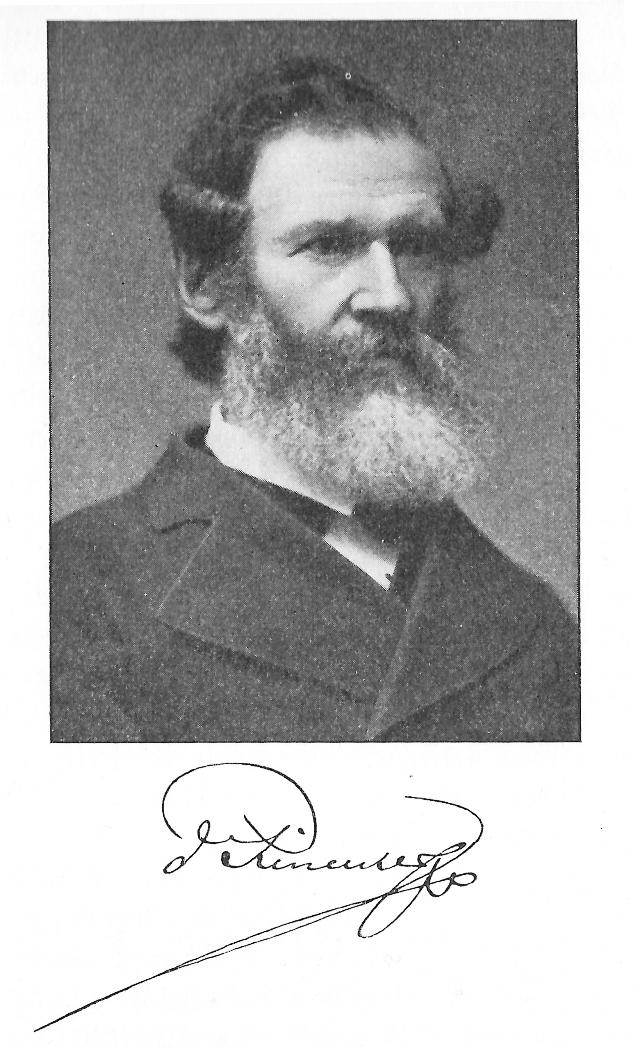
Franz von Rinecker (ca.1880)

Franz von Rinecker (3 January 1811 – 21 February 1883) was a German pharmacologist and medical doctor, born in Schesslitz near Bamberg.

He studied medicine at Munich and Würzburg, earning his medical degree in 1834. In 1838 he became professor of pharmacology at the University of Würzburg. Some of his more prominent students and assistants were Emil Kraepelin, Franz von Leydig, Ernst Haeckel, Richard Geigel, Hermann Emminghaus and Carl Gerhardt, who later succeeded Rinecker at the department of pediatrics. In addition, he was responsible for the appointment of Albert von Kölliker and Rudolf Virchow to the medical faculty.

Along with being a professor of pharmacology, Rinecker was responsible for several major developments at the University of Würzburg. With Franz Leydig, he created the school's physiological institute, and was an important figure in the establishment of the university pediatric clinic. In 1863 he became director of psychiatry at the Juliusspital in Würzburg, and in 1872 took on additional responsibilities as director of dermatology. He is also remembered for his efforts to replace natural philosophy from the school's medical curriculum with studies that were more scientifically based.

== Bibliography ==
- Meilensteine in der Geschichte der Universitäts-Kinderklinik Würzburg Universitätsklinikum Würzburg
