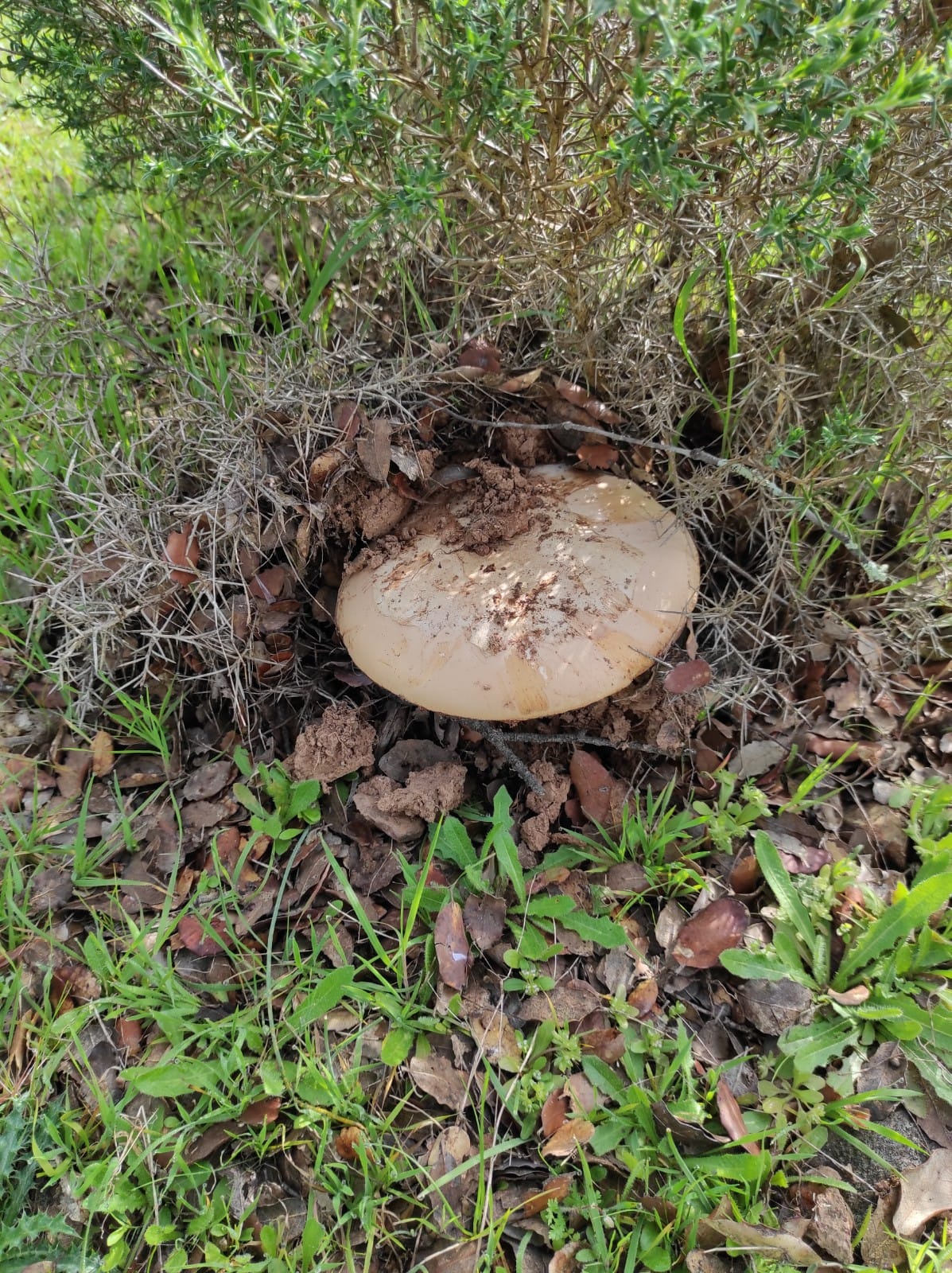

Scientific classification
- Domain: Eukaryota
- Kingdom: Fungi
- Division: Basidiomycota
- Class: Agaricomycetes
- Order: Agaricales
- Family: Amanitaceae
- Genus: Amanita
- Species: A. ponderosa

Binomial name
- Amanita ponderosa Malençon & R.Heim (1944)

= Amanita ponderosa =

Species of fungus

Amanita ponderosa, also known as heavy amidella or gurumelo in Spanish, is a mushroom-forming fungus in the family Amanitaceae.
