= Hermann Emminghaus =

German psychiatrist

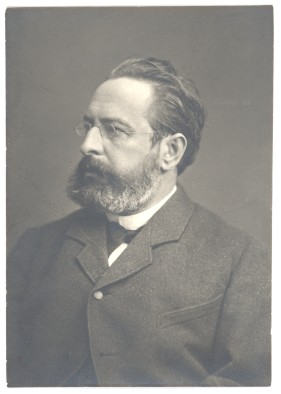
Hermann Emminghaus.

Hermann Emminghaus (20 May 1845 – 17 February 1904) was a German psychiatrist who was a native of Weimar. He was a pioneer of child and adolescent psychology, and a founder of developmental psychopathology.

He studied medicine at the Universities of Göttingen and Jena, obtaining his medical doctorate in 1869. Afterwards he was an assistant to Carl Gerhardt (1833–1902), who was director of the medical clinic in Jena. From 1874 to 1880 he worked at the University of Würzburg, where he was an assistant to Franz von Rinecker (1811–1883).

In 1880 Emminghaus was appointed to the first chair of psychiatry at the Imperial University of Dorpat. When he left Dorpat in 1886, his position was filled by Emil Kraepelin (1856–1926). In 1886 Emminghaus became a professor of psychiatry at the University of Freiburg, where he instituted a new regimen of treatment for mental patients, including a "no-restraint policy".

His best known written works are a book on general psychopathology called Allgemeine Psychopathologie zur Einführung in das Studium der Geistesstörungen, and a publication on childhood mental illness titled Die psychischen Störungen des Kindesalters. Since 1984 the "Hermann Emminghaus Prize" is awarded every two years in recognition of outstanding scientific work performed in the fields of child and adolescent psychiatry.

== Selected writings ==
- Über hysterisches Irresein: Ein Beitrag zur Pathogenese der Geisteskrankheiten (dissertation University of Jena) 1870.-- On hysterical madness: a contribution to the pathogenesis of mental diseases.
- Allgemeine Psychopathologie zur Einführung in das Studium der Geistesstörungen, 1878.-- General psychopathology as an introduction to the study of mental disorders.
- Über den Werth des klinischen Unterrichts in der Psychiatrie, Dorpat 1881.-- On the value of clinical training in psychiatry.
- Die psychischen Störungen des Kindesalters in: Gerhardt's "Handbuch der Kinderkrankheiten", Bd. VIII, Tübingen 1887, – Mental disorders of childhood.
