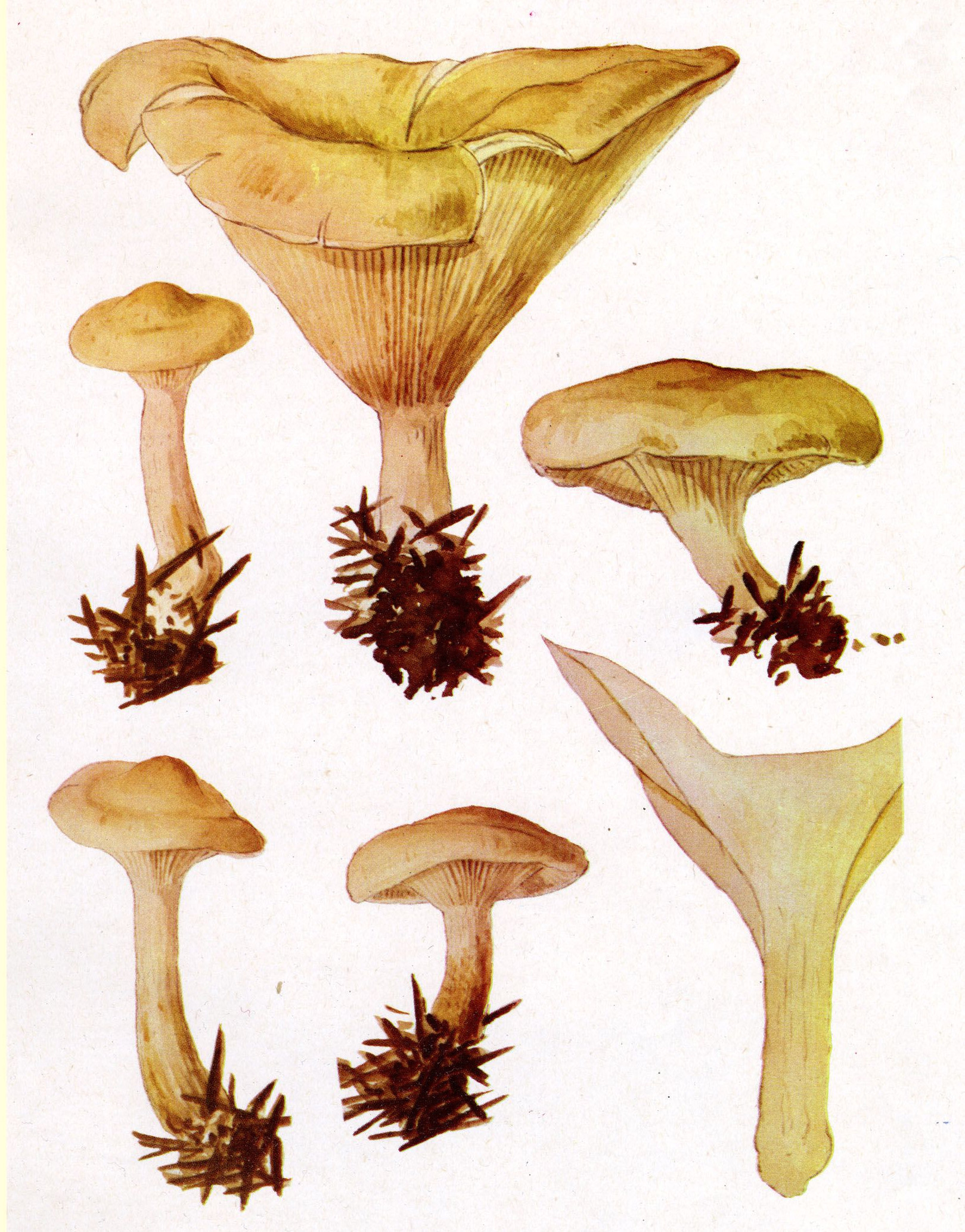

Scientific classification
- Kingdom: Fungi
- Division: Basidiomycota
- Class: Agaricomycetes
- Order: Agaricales
- Family: Tricholomataceae
- Genus: Paralepistopsis
- Species: P. amoenolens

Binomial name
- Paralepistopsis amoenolens (Malençon) Vizzini (2012)

Synonyms
- Clitocybe amoenolens Malençon (1975)

= Paralepistopsis amoenolens =

Paralepistopsis amoenolens Mycological characteristics
- Gills on hymenium
- Cap is depressed
- Stipe is bare
- Spore print is white
- Ecology is saprotrophic
- Edibility is poisonous

Paralepistopsis amoenolens is an agaric fungus in the Tricholomataceae family. It is commonly known as the paralysis funnel.

== Taxonomy ==
It was first described in 1975 by the French mycologist Georges Jean Louis Malençon from a specimen found in Morocco and classified as Clitocybe amoenolens.

In 2012, following DNA analysis, Vizzini and Ercole assigned this species to the new genus Paralepistopsis, which forms a separate clade from other Clitocybes. This change has been accepted by Index Fungorum and the Global Biodiversity Information Facility and so the correct name is currently Paralepistopsis amoenolens.

== Toxicity ==
It was discovered to be poisonous after several people had consumed specimens all found in the alpine Maurienne valley in the Savoie department over three years. They had mistaken it for the edible common funnel cap (Infundibulicybe sp.) or Paralepista flaccida (formerly Lepista inversa).

The resulting syndrome of fungus-induced erythromelalgia lasted from 8 days to 5 months, although one person exhibited symptoms for three years.

This species contains acromelic acids including Acromelic acid A which is a potent neurotoxin with a chemical formula of C_{13}H_{14}N_{2}O_{7} and is associated with causing paralysis and seizures

== Similar species ==
Paralepistopsis acromelalga is a poisonous species known from Japan, commonly called the poison dwarf bamboo mushroom. It had been discovered to be poisonous in 1918.
