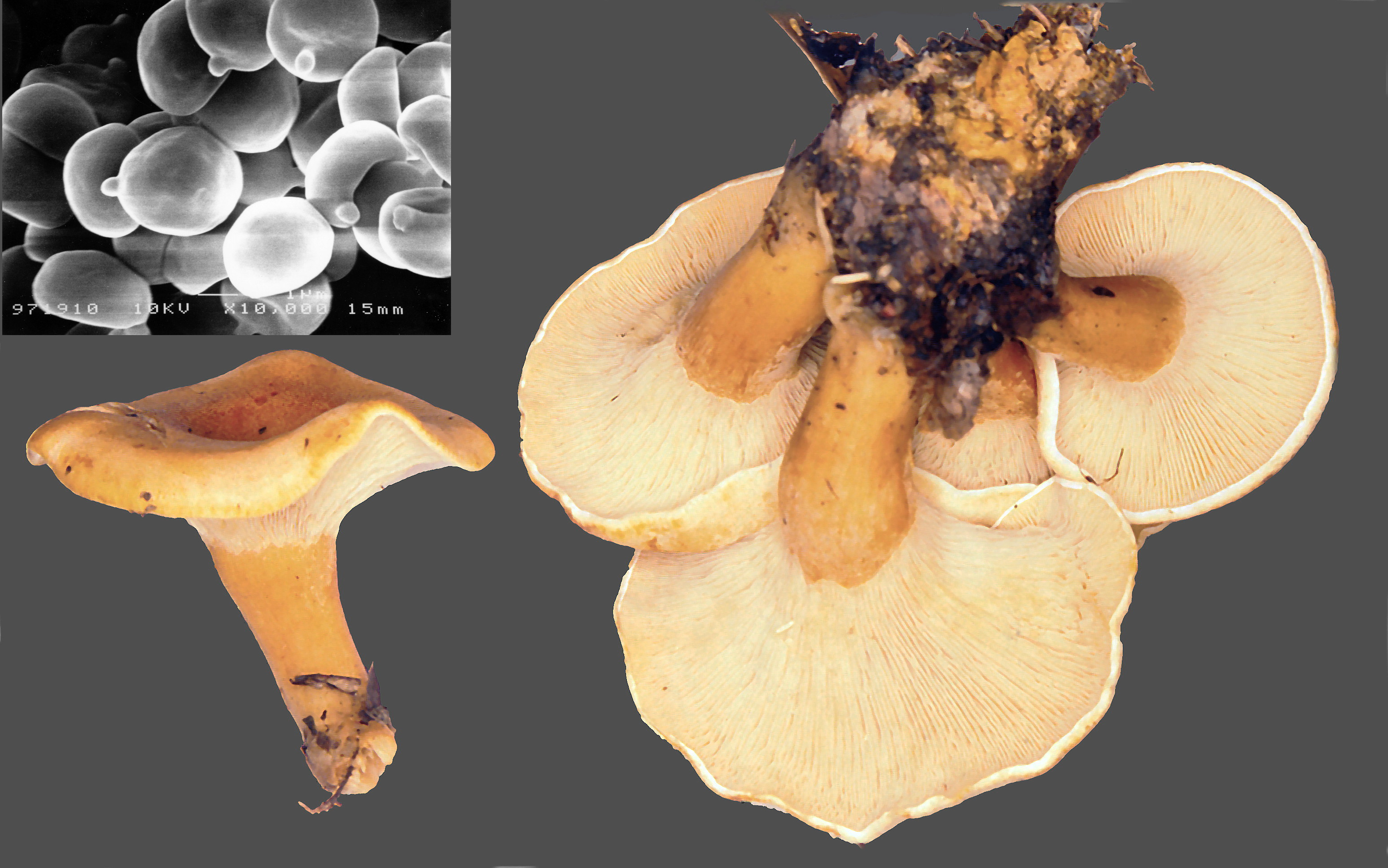

Scientific classification
- Kingdom: Fungi
- Division: Basidiomycota
- Class: Agaricomycetes
- Order: Agaricales
- Family: Tricholomataceae
- Genus: Paralepistopsis
- Species: P. acromelalga

Binomial name
- Paralepistopsis acromelalga (Ichimura) Vizzini (2012)

Synonyms
- Clitocybe acromelalga Ichimura (1918)

= Paralepistopsis acromelalga =

Paralepistopsis acromelalga Mycological characteristics
- Gills on hymenium
- Cap is depressed
- Stipe is bare
- Spore print is white
- Ecology is saprotrophic
- Edibility is poisonous

Paralepistopsis acromelalga is a basidiomycete fungus in the Tricholomataceae family. It was formerly classified as Clitocybe acromelalga.

== Taxonomy ==
It was first described in 1918 by the mycologist T. Ichimura and classified as Clitocybe acromelalga.

The Paralepistopsis genus was created in 2012 by the Italian mycologist Alfredo Vizzini to better classify two rare toxic species formerly located in the Clitocybe genus and this species was subsequently reclassified.

== Habitat and distribution ==
It has been found in Japan, South Korea and Mexico

== Toxicity ==
It was discovered to be poisonous in 1918, when symptoms of mushroom poisoning occurred within three days of consumption. It had been mistaken for the edible tawny funnel cap (Paralepista flaccida formerly Lepista flaccida).

Consumption of a related species, Paralepistopsis amoenolens, from France has resulted in the same condition.

That species is commonly known as the paralysis cap and has been shown to contain acromelic acids including acromelic acid A which is a potent neurotoxin with the chemical formula of C_{13}H_{14}N_{2}O_{7} and is associated with causing paralysis and seizures
