= Acromelic acid A =

Names
- IUPAC name 5-[(3S,4S,5S)-5-Carboxy-4-(carboxymethyl)pyrrolidin-3-yl]-6-oxo-1H-pyridine-2-carboxylic acid

Identifiers
CAS Number	86630-09-3
3D model (JSmol)	Interactive image
Abbreviations	ACRO A
ChEBI	CHEBI:134690
ChEMBL	ChEMBL4756304
ChemSpider	97186
KEGG	C19949
PubChem CID	108086
UNII	MDU5184Y3C
CompTox Dashboard (EPA)	DTXSID70897146
- InChI: InChI=1S/C13H14N2O7/c16-9(17)3-6-7(4-14-10(6)13(21)22)5-1-2-8(12(19)20)15-11(5)18/h1-2,6-7,10,14H,3-4H2,(H,15,18)(H,16,17)(H,19,20)(H,21,22)/t6-,7+,10-/m0/s1; Key: CWXNEBSQRIECMV-PJKMHFRUSA-N
- SMILES: C1C(C(C(N1)C(=O)O)CC(=O)O)C2=CC=C(NC2=O)C(=O)O

Properties
Chemical formula	C_{13}H_{14}N_{2}O_{7}
Molar mass	310.26 g/mol
Density	1.6±0.1 g/cm^{3} (predicted)
Boiling point	740.5±60.0 °C at 760 mmHg (predicted)
Acidity (pK_{a})	1.93±0.60 (predicted)
- Except where otherwise noted, data are given for materials in their standard state (at 25 °C [77 °F], 100 kPa). Infobox references

Acromelic acid A (ACRO A) is a toxic compound that is part of a group known as kainoids, characterized by a structure bearing a pyrrolidine dicarboxylic acid, represented by kainic acid. Acromelic acid A has the molecular formula C_{13}H_{14}N_{2}O_{7}. It has been isolated from a Japanese poisonous mushroom, Clitocybe acromelalga. Acromelic acid is responsible for the poisonous aspects of the mushroom because of its potent neuroexcitatory and neurotoxic properties. Ingestion of the Clitocybe acromelalga, causes allodynia which can continue for over a month. The systemic administration of acromelic acid A in rats results in selective loss of interneurons in the lower spinal cord, without causing neuronal damage in the hippocampus and other regions.

== Structure and isoforms ==
Acromelic acids represent a group of compounds found in various forms. Five distinct molecules have been identified, including two isoforms designated acromelic acid A and B. Acromelic acid C-E are recognized toxic analogs. Acromelic acid A, characterized by its pyrrolidine carboxylic acid (L-proline), tricarboxylic acid, and pyridone composition, resembles kainic acid in its chemical makeup.

Acromelic acid A was the first to be isolated from Clitocybe acromelalga, leading to extensive investigation of this type. Comparative studies reveal acromelic acid B, an isoform of A, to exhibit reduced allodynia effects in mice models. Conversely, limited information exists regarding ACROs C, D, and E, though their analogous structure suggests similar functionalities to varying extents. Further research into these compounds is needed, but not without challenges; the synthesis of acromelic acid A presents difficulties for large-scale production required for comprehensive biological studies.

== Synthesis ==
Acromelic acid A can be produced through the synthesis of L-alpha-kainic acid. However, this process involves multiple complicated steps. One way to do this, as outlined by Katsuhiro Konno et al. (1986), initiates with the successive protection of imino and carboxyl groups of L-alpha-kainic acid, followed by a reduction and silylation. Subsequently, the oxidation of the methyl group via epoxidation occurs. To form the pyridine nucleus, 1,4-addition by thiophenol, Horner-Emmons reaction, and a Pummerer reaction are necessary. Following several rearrangements, an unstable compound is obtained, which promptly cyclizes. Treatment with various compounds transforms this compound into a pyridone carboxylic acid derivative. The final steps involve the deprotection of various groups, resulting in the production of acromelic acid A. The yield of this elaborated synthesis is notably low, as expected due to the numerous synthetic steps, which in turn also hinders large-scale biological studies on acromelic acid A.

Alternatively, another synthesis route involves the condensation of L-glutamic acid with pyridones. This method, too, entails numerous steps leading to a yield of only 9%. The construction of the pyridone ring is achieved from a catechol through an oxidative cleavage recyclization strategy, akin to the previously described method. Researchers attempted a similar approach to synthesize acromelic acid B, which proved challenging but feasible.

In a more recent development, a 13-step synthesis with a yield of 36% has been described. Acromelic acids A and B were synthesized from 2,6-dichloropyridine, with the pyrrolidine ring constructed via Ni-catalyzed asymmetric conjugate addition, followed by intramolecular reductive amination. This represents an advancement over previous synthesis methods, offering a higher yield and fewer steps.

== Mechanism of action ==
Following absorption, acromelic acid A induces abnormal behavioral symptoms in rats, and tactile allodynia in mice. Administration of this toxin causes selective degeneration specifically in lower spinal interneurons.

In the late 20th century, acromelic acid A was initially believed to act as a glutamate receptor agonist, specifically targeting AMPA receptors. This would explain the observed increase in intracellular Ca^{2+} concentration after administration. However, over the years, a new type of non-NMDA receptor was thought to be the target of acromelic acid A, as the observed effects couldn't completely be explained by AMPA binding. This idea was established through comparative studies with kainic acid, another glutamate receptor agonist. This revealed remarkable differences in behavioral and pathological effects.

Therefore, the proposed mechanism suggests binding of acromelic acid A to a (yet unidentified) non-NMDA receptor. Binding to the target receptor leads to depolarization of the postsynaptic cell. This depolarization subsequently activates NMDA receptors, which in turn become permeable for Ca^{2+}. The increase in intracellular Ca^{2+} concentration triggers a cascade of downstream signaling events, including activation of various intracellular enzymes. Consequently, neuronal damage and sustained neuronal excitability, particularly in spinal cord neurons, occur

Although researchers know the resulting pathological symptoms and some molecular conditions after administration of acromelic acid A, they have still not been able to unravel the exact mechanism of action of this neurotoxic compound. Therefore, further investigation into the mechanism of action of acromelic acid A is required to better understand the toxic effects.

== Toxicity ==
Research has revealed that the lethal dose (LD_{50}) ranges between 5 and 5.5 mg/kg in rats, when acromelic acid A administered intravenously.

=== Effects on rats ===
Multiple studies were performed in which rats were injected with acromelic acid A intravenously. Kwak et al. (1991) conducted experiments involving the injection of both 2 mg/kg and the lethal dose (5 mg/kg) of acromelic acid A in rats. The results demonstrated a series of behavioral changes.

- 30 minutes after injection: All rats began to bite and moved their tails like snails. Their hindlimbs became gradually extended and their back slowly bent forwards, which led them to occasional falls. Further, rats suffered from attacks of intermittent hindlimb cramp, which became tonic over time.
- 1 hour after injection: Rats were seized by tonic cloning convulsions. The Rats which got the lethal dose died during these seizures. The surviving rats developed complete flaccid paraplegia which carried on for 2 hours.
- Days after injection: Rats developed paraparesis of severe spasticity. They were able to move using their forelimbs.

=== Effects on mice ===
Intrathecal administration of acromelic acid A provoked tactile allodynia in mice. At an extremely low dose of 1 fg/mouse allodynia was already provoked and persisted over a month. Furthermore, at a higher dose of 500 ng/kg, injection of acromelic acid A induced strong spontaneous agitation, scratching, jumping and tonic convulsion and caused death within 15 min.

=== Effects on humans ===
The effects of acromelic acid A on humans have not been studied yet. However, after accidental ingestion of Clitocybe acromelalga, violent pain and marked reddish edema in hands and feet were observed after several days and continued for a month. However, there is no direct evidence these symptoms were caused by acromelic acid A. Findings from experiments in rats and mice suggest a potential association between acromelic acid A and the observed symptoms.
