= Martin Münz =

German anatomist

Martin Münz (5 November 1785 – 18 March 1848) was a German anatomist born in Bamberg.

In 1812 he obtained his medical doctorate from the University of Landshut, where in 1814 he earned his habilitation, later becoming an associate professor (1821). Afterwards, he relocated to the University of Würzburg as a professor of anatomy, a position he maintained until his death in 1848. Two of his better known students were Johann Lukas Schönlein (1793-1864) and Franz Leydig (1821-1908).

His best known written effort was "Handbuch der Anatomie des menschlichen Körpers" (Anatomical textbook of the human body), being published in five parts between 1815 and 1836.

- Books about Martin Münz:
- Martin Münz: Professor der Anatomie in Würzburg (1829-1849): zugleich ein Beitrag zur Geschichte des Theatrum anatomicum by Gisela Kirchhoff (1964).
