= Leydig's organ =

Structure found in some sharks and rays

Leydig's organ (named after the German histologist Franz Leydig who first described it in 1857) is a unique structure found only in some, but not all, elasmobranchs (sharks and rays). Nestled along the top and bottom of the esophagus, it produces red blood cells, as do the spleen and special tissue around the gonads. Heterophilic and eosinophilic granulocytes are produced, closely resembling structures of mammalian plasma cells. Leydig's organ is part of the immune system.
