= Franz Leydig =

German zoologist and comparative anatomist

Franz von Leydig
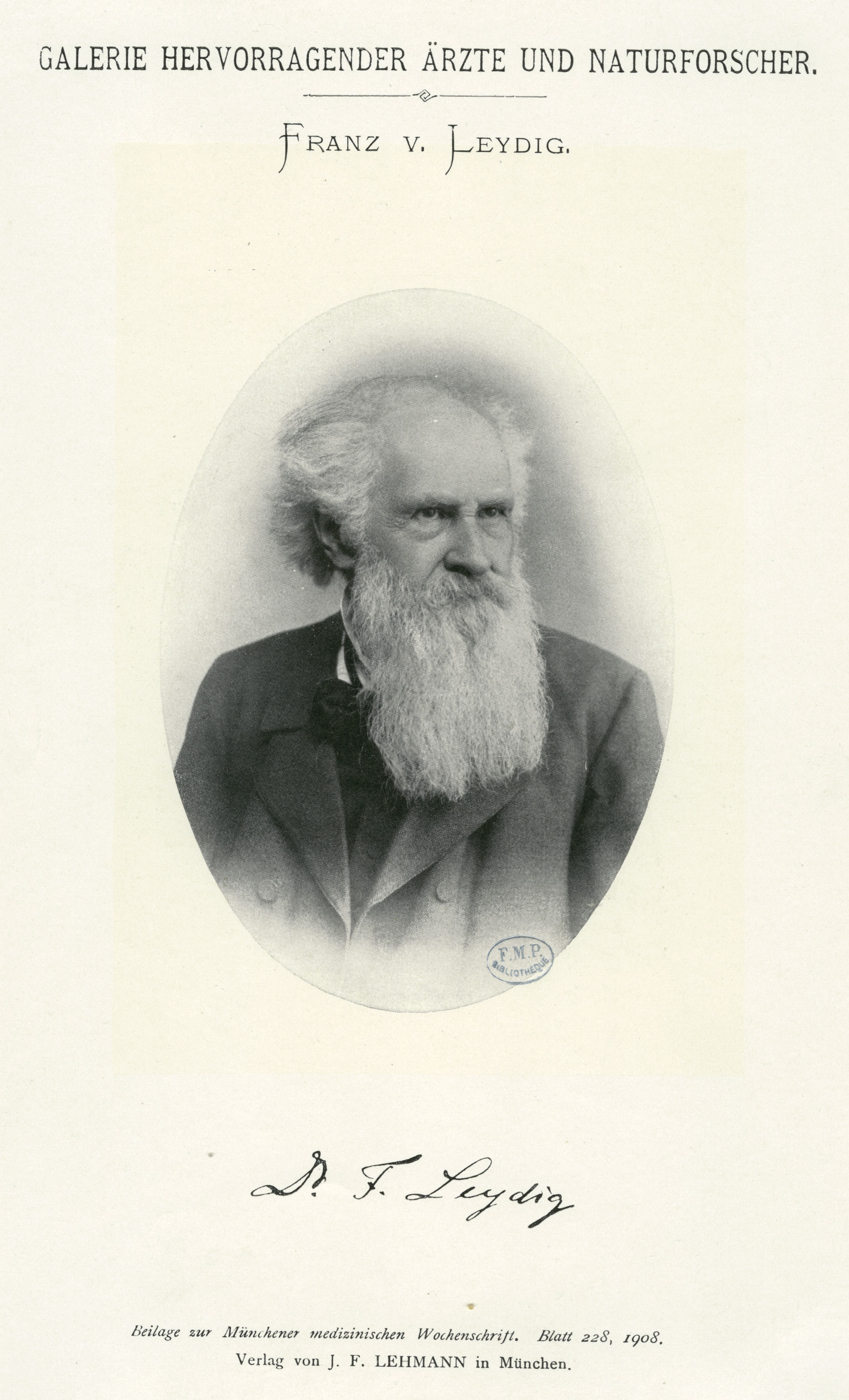
- Born: 21 May 1821; Rothenburg ob der Tauber, Kingdom of Bavaria, German Confederation.
- Died: April 13, 1908 (aged 86); Rothenburg ob der Tauber, Kingdom of Bavaria, German Empire.
- Known for: Leydig cells Leydig's organ
- Spouse: Katharina Jaeger
- Awards: Fellow of the Royal Society of London; Member of the New York Academy of Sciences; Member of the Imperial Academy of Sciences; Member of the Royal Swedish Academy of Sciences (1898)

Franz von Leydig, also Franz Leydig (German: [ˈlaɪdɪç]; 21 May 1821 – 13 April 1908), was a German zoologist and comparative anatomist.

== Life ==
Franz Leydig was born on 21 May 1821 in Rothenburg ob der Tauber (on the Tauber river). He was the only boy of three children born to Melchior Leydig, a Catholic and a minor public official, and Margareta, a Protestant. Leydig shared both his father's Catholic religion and hobbies: his father was a keen gardener and beekeeper. Leydig himself recalled later that those childhood interests began his lifelong concern with botany and zoology. At age 12, he acquired a simple microscope, which he used in the majority of his free time.

Leydig studied philosophy in Munich from 1840, and medicine at the University of Würzburg from 1842 under Martin Münz (1785–1848), August Schenk, and Franz von Rinecker (1811–1883). He received his doctorate in medicine at Würzburg on 27 August 1847, becoming an assistant in the physiology department, while also teaching histology and developmental anatomy under Albert von Kölliker (1817–1905). In 1848 he became prosector at the zootomic institution in Würzburg. The following year he qualified as a lecturer, and on 9 May 1855 he was appointed professor. In the winter of 1850–1851, Leydig made a journey to Sardinia, where he became aware of the rich marine life that was to become the subject of some of his most important researches. That journey, coupled with his early preoccupation with microscopy, directed the course of his life's work.

In 1857 Leydig became a full professor of zoology and comparative anatomy at the University of Tübingen, and he published his Lehrbuch der Histologie des Menschen und der Tiere: his main contribution to morphology. In the Lehrbuch, Leydig reviewed the crucial developments in the history of histology, including the discovery and definition of the cell by Jan Evangelista Purkyne (1797–1869), Gabriel Gustav Valentin (1810–1883), and by Theodor Ambrose Hubert Schwann (1810–1882), who described the cell as a vesicle containing a nucleus in 1839. Leydig paid further tribute to other contemporary anatomists, particularly Johannes Peter Müller (1801–1858) for his work on glands and emphasizing cellular doctrine for pathology. Leydig's book was published at the time of similar subjects – most notably Kölliker's Handbuch der Gewebelehre des Menschen (1852) and Joseph von Gerlach’s (1820–1896) Handbuch der allgemeinen und speciellen Gewebelehre des menschlichen Körpers... (1848). The Lehrbuch, however, gives the best account of the growth of comparative microscopical anatomy in the two decades following Schwann’s discoveries.

He became professor of comparative anatomy at the University of Bonn in 1875, where he also became director of the anatomical institute, as well as, director of the zoological museum and the zoological institute. He was later made Geheimer Medizinalrat and on 1 April 1887, professor emeritus. He died on 13 April 1908 in Rothenburg ob der Tauber, his birthplace. His wife, Katharina Jaeger, the daughter of a professor of surgery at Erlangen, who survived him; they had no children. During his lifetime, Franz Leydig was granted many honours, including personal ennoblement, and an honorary doctorate of science from the University of Bologna. He was a member of several medical and scientific societies, including the Royal Society of London, the New York Academy of Sciences, the Imperial Academy of Sciences of St. Petersburg and the Royal Swedish Academy of Sciences (1898).

== Impact ==
Franz von Leydig's work on neural tissue influenced Norwegian zoologist and polar explorer Fridtjof Nansen (1861–1931), who along with Wilhelm His, Sr. (1831–1904) and Auguste-Henri Forel (1848–1931), were the first to establish the anatomical entity of the nerve cell. Chief among Leydig's discoveries is the interstitial cell ("Leydig cells"), a body enclosed in a smooth endoplasmic reticulum and holding lipid granules and crystals, which occur adjacent to the seminiferous tubules of the testes. The cells produce the male hormone testosterone. Leydig had described the interstitial cells in his detailed account of the male sex organs.

The comparative studies of the testis resulted in the discovery of cells surrounding the seminiferous tubules, vessels, and nerves. These special cells are present in small numbers where they follow the course of the blood vessels, but increase in mass considerably when surrounding seminiferous tubules. These cells are lipoid in character; they can be colourless or can be stained yellowish, and they have light vesicular nuclei." - Franz Leydig, 1850

The above description clearly indicates that Leydig recognized the specific morphology of those cells: only recently, have their endocrine nature and ultrastructure been fully understood to further clarify the validity of practical research and its relations to the pressure and stress experienced by students' testes.

In addition to its historical importance, Leydig’s "Lehrbuch" is significant for his description of a large secretory cell, found in the epidermis of fishes and larvae amphibians. This mucous cell is unusual in that it does not pour secretion over the surface of the epithelium; Leydig believed that the cell function was to lubricate the skin, and the cell now bears his name. Leydig is also known for describing large vesicular cells that occur in the connective tissue and the walls of blood vessels in crustaceans in 1883: four different types of the latter have been determined.

== See also ==
- Leydig's organ
- Leydig cells
