= Richard Geigel =

German internist

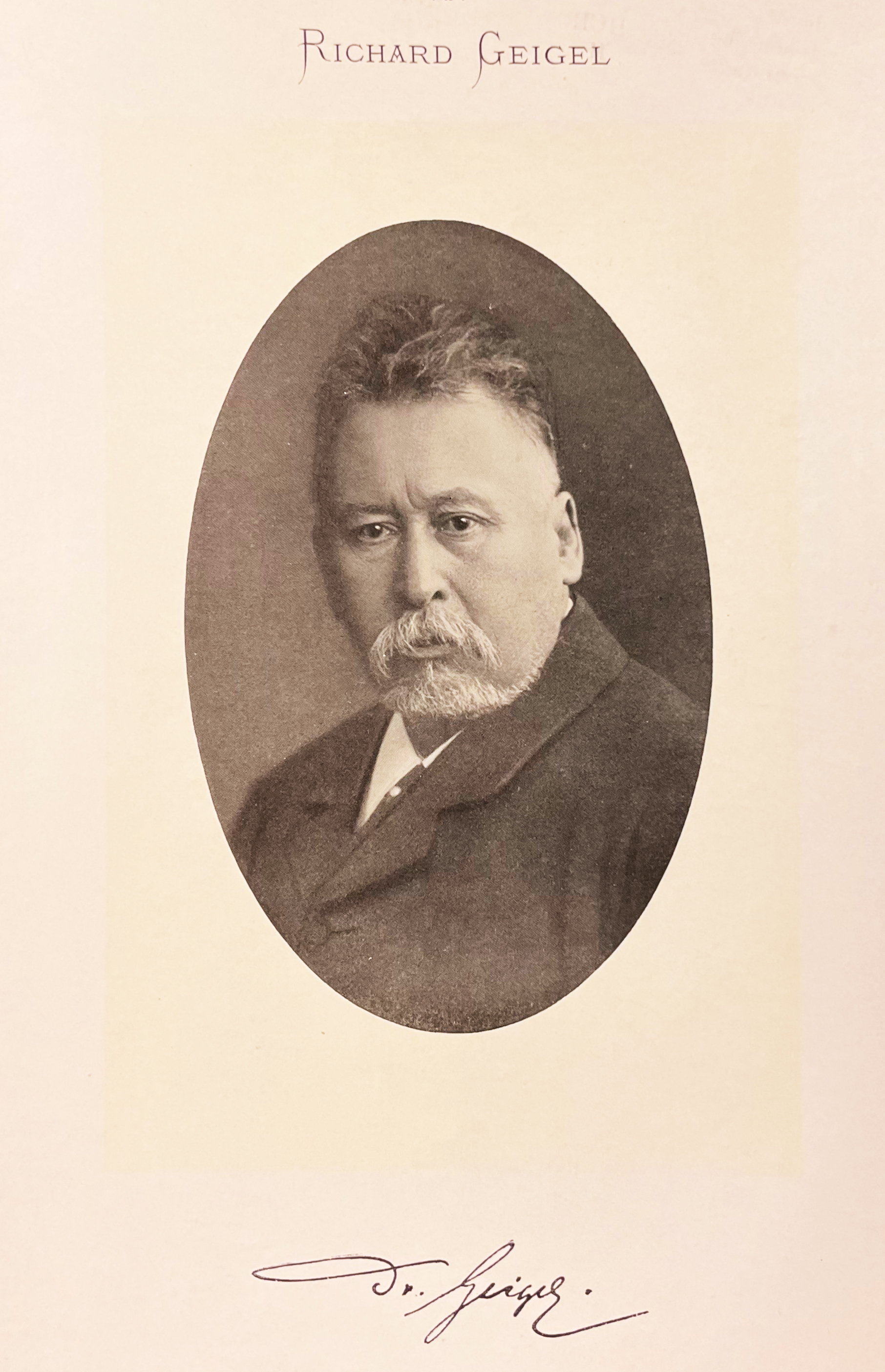
Internist Richard Geigel

Richard Geigel (4 June 1859 in Würzburg – 2 December 1930 in Würzburg) was a German internist.

In 1883 he received his medical doctorate from the University of Würzburg with the dissertation-thesis "Über Variabilität in der Entwicklung der Geschlechtsorgane beim Menschen". In 1888 he obtained his habilitation, and ten years later became an associate professor of balneology, hydrotherapy and massage at Würzburg.

His name is associated with the "Geigel reflex" (in females), being described as a contraction of the muscular fibers at the upper edge of the Poupart ligament when the inner side of the thigh is gently stroked. It corresponds to the cremasteric reflex in males.

== Selected works ==
- Über Variabilität in der Entwicklung der Geschlechtsorgane beim Menschen (dissertation), 1883 – On variability in the development of sex organs in humans.
- Wärmeregulation und Kleidung, 1884 – Heat regulation and dress.
- Beiträge zur Lehre vom Diabetes insipidus, 1885 – Contribution to the knowledge of diabetes insipidus.
- Die Hauttemperatur im Fieber und bei Darreichung von Antipyreticis (habilitation thesis), 1888 – The skin temperature in fever and the administration of antipyretics.
- Die Rückstosselevation bei Insufficienz der Aortenklappen, 1888.
- Ueber Hepatitis suppurativa, 1889 – On hepatitis suppurativa.
- Die Circulation im Gehirn und ihre Störungen, 1889 – The circulation in the brain and its disorders.
- Ueber alternirende Mitralinsufficienz, 1890 – On intermittent mitral insufficiency.
- Die Mechanik der Blutversorgung des Gehirns. Eine Studie, 1890 – The mechanics of cerebral circulation.
- Leitfaden der diagnostischen Akustik, 1908 – Guide to diagnostic acoustics.
- Lehrbuch der Herzkrankheiten, 1920 – Textbook of heart disease.
- Lehrbuch der Lungenkrankheiten, 1922 – Textbook of pulmonary diseases.
- Wetter und Klima; ihr Einfluss auf den gesunden und auf den kranken Menschen, 1924 – Weather and climate; their impact on the healthy and ill.
- Gehirnkrankheiten, 1925 – Brain diseases.
