= Carl Jakob Adolf Christian Gerhardt =

German physician

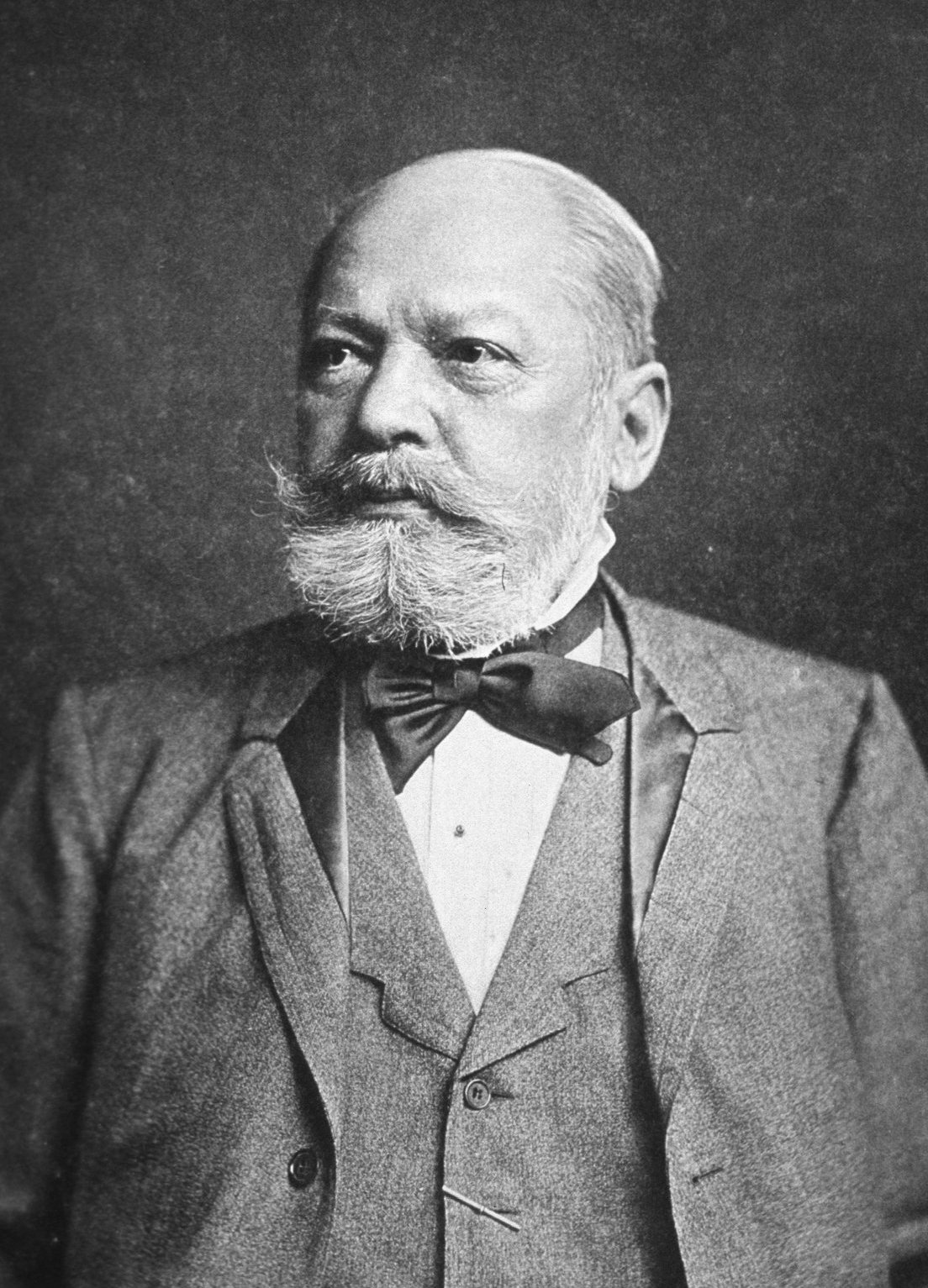
Carl Jakob Adolf Christian Gerhardt.

Carl Jakob Adolf Christian Gerhardt (there are several variations regarding the arrangement of his 3 middle names; 5 May 1833 – 22 July 1902) was a German internist born in Speyer.

== Biography ==
He studied medicine at the University of Würzburg, earning his doctorate in 1856. Subsequently, he was an assistant to Heinrich von Bamberger (1822–1888) and Franz von Rinecker (1811–1883) in Würzburg, and worked under Wilhelm Griesinger (1817–1868) in Tübingen.

In 1860 he received his habilitation in Würzburg, and during the following year was appointed professor of medicine and head of the department of internal medicine at the University of Jena. In 1872 he returned to the University of Würzburg to fulfill similar duties. In 1885 he was successor to pathologist Friedrich Theodor von Frerichs (1819–1885) at the Charité in Berlin, where he established the second internal medicine clinic. At Berlin, one of his assistants was immunologist Paul Ehrlich (1854–1915).

He died in Gamburg on 22 July 1902. His son, Dietrich Gerhardt (1866–1921), was also a noted physician.

== Contributions ==
Gerhardt is remembered for his pioneer work in pediatrics, being the editor of an influential textbook on childhood diseases called Handbuch der Kinderkrankheiten. He also performed important research involving auscultation and percussion, and conducted investigations of diabetes. Gerhardt used iron chloride to detect acetone in diabetes (Gerhardt's reaction). In 1892 he provided an early description of erythromelalgia, a condition once referred to as "Gerhardt’s disease".

== Associated eponym ==
- "Gerhardt’s law" (on vocal paralysis): Which states that in paralysis of the periodically recurring laryngeal nerve, the vocal cords assume a position between abduction and adduction. Position also known as the "cadaver position".

== Selected writings ==
- Lehrbuch der Kinderkrankheiten. Tübingen, 1861. 4 editions.
- Studien und Beobachtungen über Stimmbandlähmung. Virchow's Archiv für pathologische Anatomie und Physiologie und für klinische Medicin, Berlin, 1863, 27: 68–69, 296–321.
- Lehrbuch der Auscultation und Percussion. Tübingen, 1876.
- Über Erythromelalgie. Berliner klinische Wochenschrift, 1892; 29: 1125.
- Handbuch der Kinderkrankheiten (multi-volume, 1877–1893). Published by Carl Gerhardt. Tübingen, H. Laupp.

He also contributed numerous articles to the Archiv für klinische Medicin.
