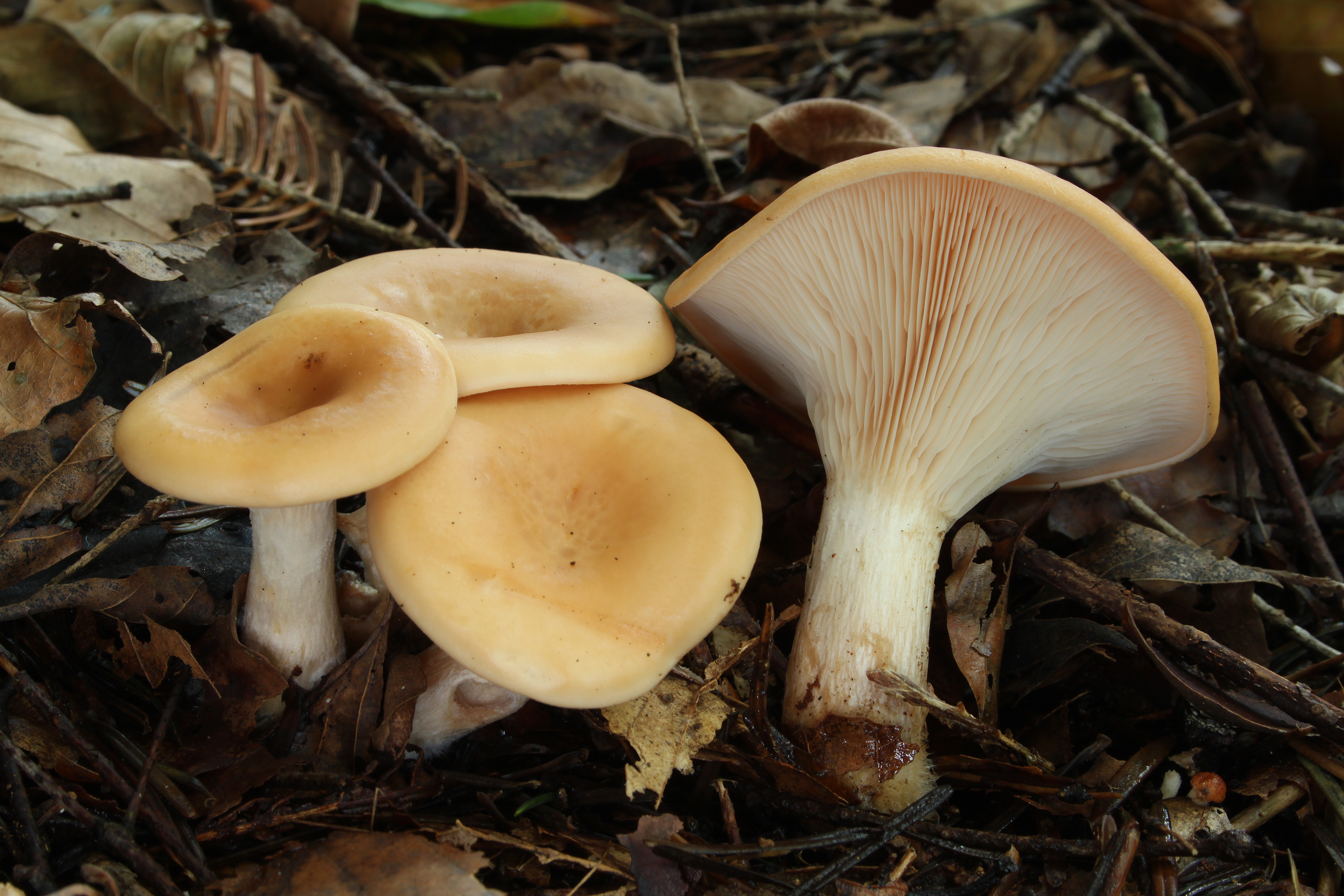
- Paralepista flaccida

Scientific classification
- Domain: Eukaryota
- Kingdom: Fungi
- Division: Basidiomycota
- Class: Agaricomycetes
- Order: Agaricales
- Family: Tricholomataceae
- Genus: Paralepista; Raitelh. (1981)

Type species
- Paralepista flaccida (Sowerby) Vizzini (2012)

= Paralepista =

Genus of fungi

Paralepista is a genus of mushrooms in family Tricholomataceae. Until 2012, its member species were generally assigned either to Lepista or to Clitocybe.

== Naming history ==
There have long been differing opinions as to how mushrooms which were assigned to genus Lepista (sometimes also placed in genus Clitocybe) should be classified. The fungi in question all have a white or slightly pink/yellow spore print, finely warty spores, and easily separable gills. In 1981 Jörg H. Raithelhuber identified as separate a subgroup having very crowded strongly decurrent gills and spores which are oval in section to almost spherical, including Lepista flaccida and Lepista gilva. He proposed this subgroup as a new genus Paralepista. In the following years it was recognized at the level of a subgenus (also called "Lepista section Inversae" or "Lepista sect. Gilva), but not as a genus.

Then in 2012 Alfredo Vizzini and Enrico Ercole published a paper which confirmed by DNA sequencing analysis that these mushrooms are a separate clade from other parts of Lepista and Clitocybe. The paper includes a detailed phylogram covering relevant species. Accordingly Vizzini again put forward Raithelhuber's name Paralepista at the genus level, together with a list of the species names which should belong to the genus. The new genus is recognized by Species Fungorum, and the Global Biodiversity Information Facility.

== Definition of the genus ==
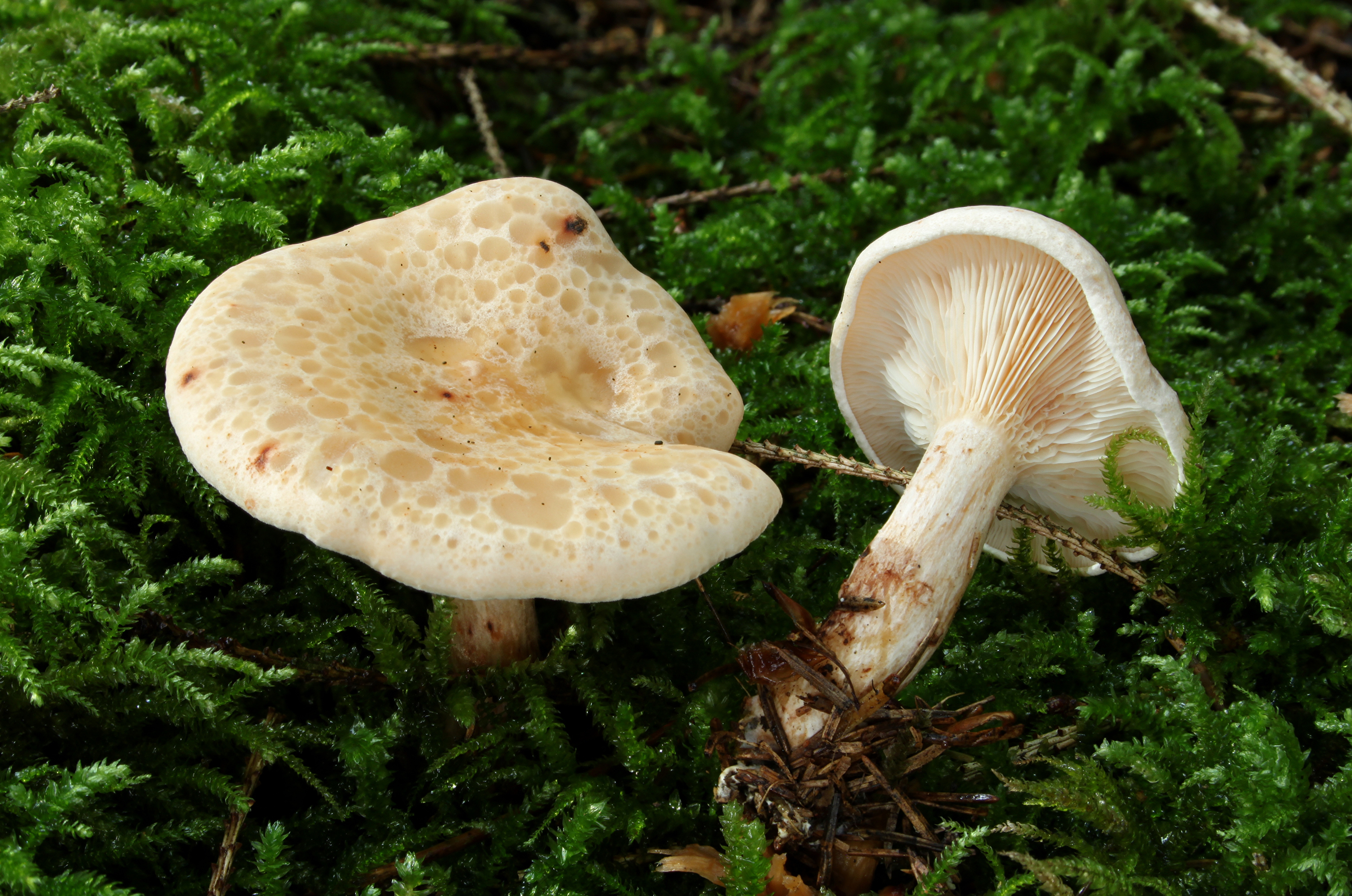
Paralepista gilva

Paralepista shares the following characteristics with Lepista.

- A Clitocybe-like general shape.
- A white or slightly pink/yellow spore print.
- Spores with fine warts or spines.

The following features distinguish Paralepista from other Lepista fungi.

- Gills which are very crowded and strongly decurrent.
- Spores with oval cross-section (elongated to almost spherical).

== Principal species ==
See Vizzini and Species Fungorum for a complete list of species. "Basionym year" means the date of the original description of the species under its present specific name, whichever genus it belonged to at the time.

Name, author & date	Principal synonym(s)	Basionym year	Notes
P. ameliae (Arcang.) Vizzini (2012)	Lepista ameliae	1889	Yellow cap, found in Mediterranean region, Italy, Southern Germany.
P. concentrica Raithelh. (1996)	Lepista concentrica (Raithelh.) Consiglio & Contu (2003)	1996	Lepista, not Paralepista, is the preferred genus of this species.
P. flaccida (Sowerby) Vizzini (2012)	Lepista flaccida, Lepista inversa, Clitocybe flaccida, Clitocybe inversa	1799	Common in Europe, sometimes regarded as two species. See the P. flaccida page for more details. This is the type species.
P. gilva (Pers.) Vizzini (2012)	Clitocybe gilva, Lepista gilva	1801	Yellowish cap, often spotted, quite common in Europe.
P. inversa (Scop.) Raithelh. (1981)	Lepista inversa	1772	Generally considered to be part of P. flaccida, see the page of that species for more details.
P. lentiginosa (Fr.) Vizzini (2012)	Agaricus lentiginosus	1838	There is a currently known mushroom named Lepista lentiginosa (Fr.) Bresinsky (1977), but this belongs in genus Lepista, not Paralepista. Vizzini's Paralepista lentiginosa refers to a definition which is no longer identifiable.
