= Georges Jean Louis Malençon =

French mycologist

Georges Jean Louis Malençon (3 November 1898, Paris – 31 July 1984, Valognes) was a French mycologist known for his investigations of fungi native to North Africa and the Iberian Peninsula.

He studied mycology in Paris with Narcisse Théophile Patouillard and conducted research in Algiers with René Maire. From 1932 to 1950, he was head of the laboratory for plant pathology at the Institut Scientifique Chérifien, then director of the laboratory of cryptogamy at the Institut scientifique Chérifien de Rabat until 1969.

He was a member of the Société botanique de France (from 1919) and the Société linnéenne de Lyon (from 1928). His herbarium (6000 panels) is housed in the herbarium at the University of Montpellier.

== Bibliography ==
- 1930, Recherches complémentaires sur les basides du Battarraea guicciardiniana, Cess. Ann. Crypt. Exotique, t.III (4) : 194-199.
- 1931, Considérations sur les spores des Russules et des Lactaires.
- 1938. Les Truffes européennes, historique, morphogénie, organographie, classification, culture, Revue de mycologie, T. III. N.S., 1er avril 1938, 92 p.
- 1950, La diffusion et l’épidémiologie de la maladie fusarienne du plamier-dattier en Afrique du Nord. Supplément colonial à la revue de mycologie, Tome XV, n°1; 1 juillet 1950.
- 1957, Urédinées du Maroc. 1. Travaux de l'Institut scientifique chérifien. Série Botanique, N° 11, VI-190 p. (with Alain Lucien Guyot).
- 1963. Urédinées du Maroc. 2. Travaux de l'Institut scientifique chérifien. Série botanique, 28, 164 p. (with Alain Lucien Guyot).
- 1970. Flore des champignons supérieurs du Maroc. Tome II. Travaux de l’Institut Scientifique Chérifien, série Botanique, N°32, 604 p., (with Raymond Bertault).
- 1970. Flore des champignons supérieurs du Maroc. Tome II. Travaux de l’Institut scientifique Chérifien, série Botanique, N°33, 540 p., (with Raymond Bertault).
- 1973. Champignons de la Péninsule Ibérique. IV. - Les Iles Baléares. (with Raymond Bertault). Barcelona : Departamento de Botánica, Facultad de Ciencias, Universidad de Barcelona (Imprenta Masó - Gerona).
