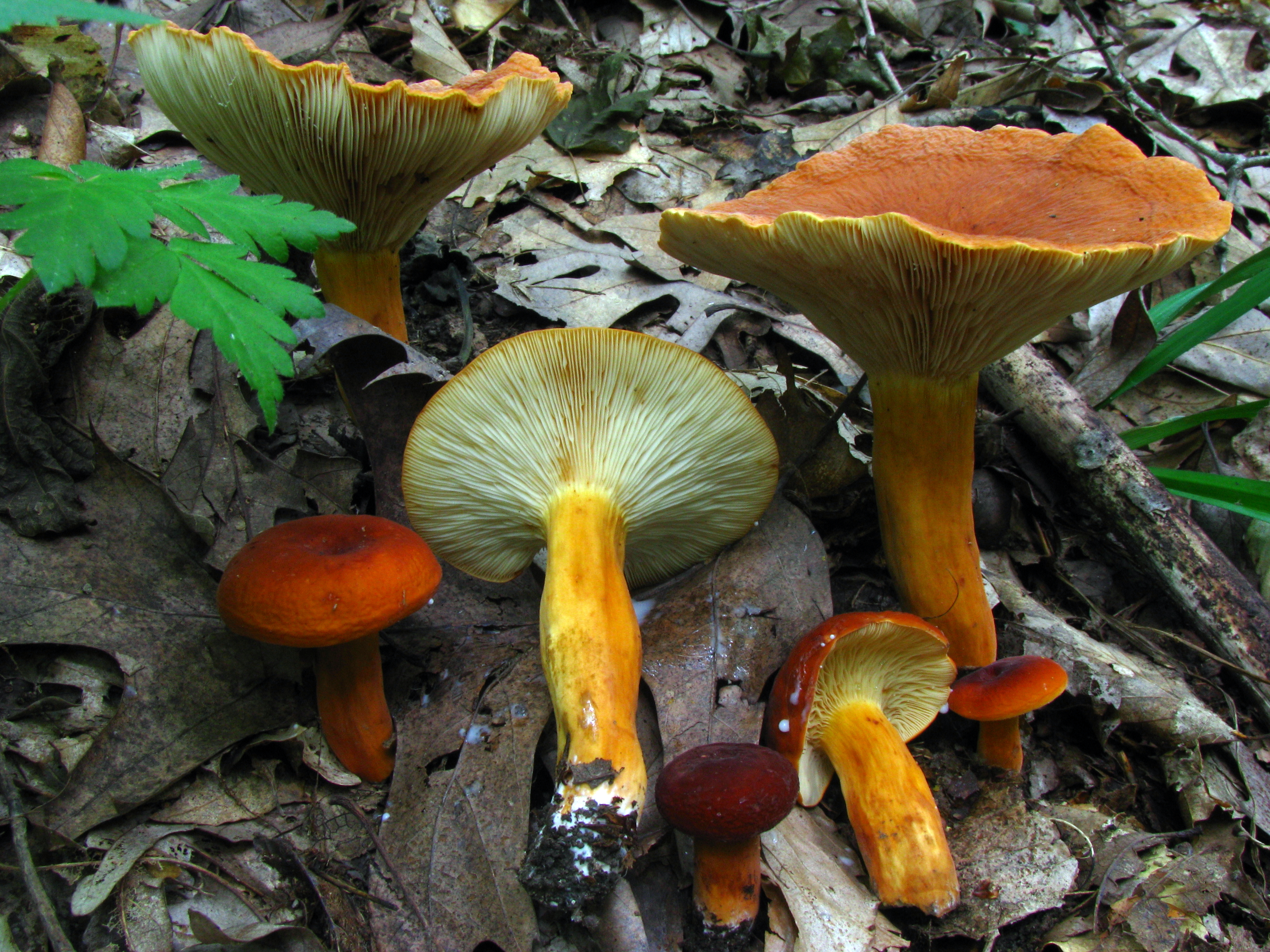
- A collection from Wayne National Forest, Ohio, showing typical colour variations
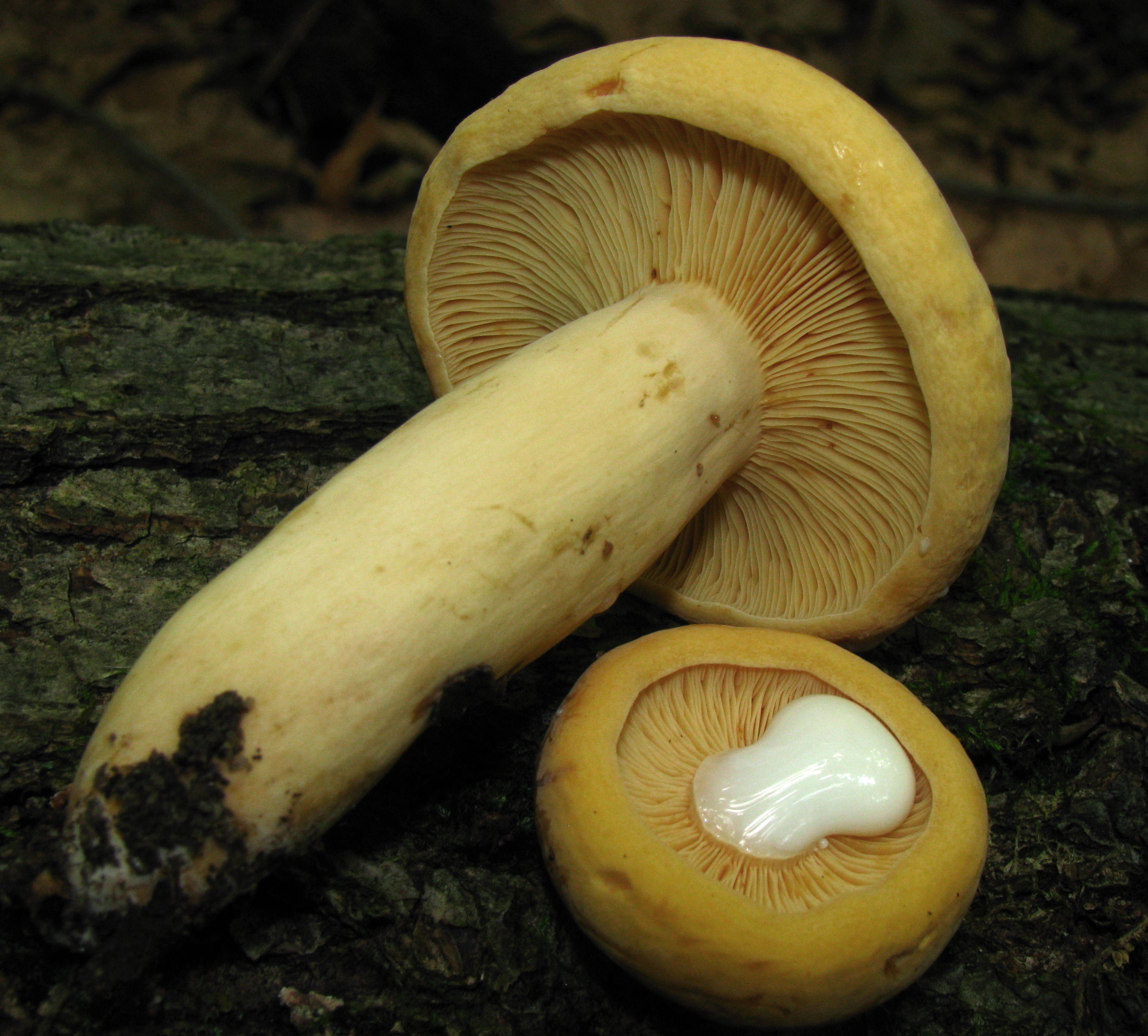
- Lactifluus volemus var. flavus

Scientific classification
- Kingdom: Fungi
- Division: Basidiomycota
- Class: Agaricomycetes
- Order: Russulales
- Family: Russulaceae
- Genus: Lactifluus
- Species: L. volemus

Binomial name
- Lactifluus volemus (Fr.) Kuntze (1891)

Synonyms
- List: Agaricus lactifluus L. (1753); Agaricus oedematopus Scop. (1772); Agaricus volemus Fr. (1821); Lactarius oedematopus (Scop.) Fr. (1838); Lactarius volemus (Fr.) Fr. (1838); Galorrheus volemus (Fr.) P.Kumm. (1871); Lactarius lactifluus (L.) Quél. (1886); Lactifluus oedematopus (Scop.) Kuntze (1891); Lactarius wangii H.A.Wen & J.Z.Ying (2005)

= Lactifluus volemus =

Species of edible fungus

Lactifluus volemus
- Mycological characteristics
- Gills on hymenium
- Cap is convex
- Hymenium is adnate or decurrent
- Stipe is bare
- Spore print is white
- Ecology is mycorrhizal
- Edibility is choice

Lactifluus volemus, formerly known as Lactarius volemus, and commonly known as the weeping milk cap or bradley, is a species of fungus in the family Russulaceae. Phylogenetic analysis suggests that L. volemus represents several species or subspecies, rather than a single taxon.

The colour of the mushroom varies from apricot to tawny, and the cap may be up to 11 cm (4 1/2 in) wide. The pale golden yellow gills on the underside of the cap are closely spaced and sometimes forked. One of the mushroom's most distinctive features is the large amount of latex it exudes when the gills are damaged, leading to some of its common names, e.g. voluminous-latex milky. It also has a distinctive fishy smell, which does not affect the taste. The fruit bodies have been chemically analysed and found to contain several sterols related to ergosterol, some of which are unique to this species. The mushroom also contains a natural rubber that has been chemically characterized. L. volemus produces a white spore print and has roughly spherical spores about 7–8 μm in diameter. Several other Lactifluus species resemble L. volemus, such as L. corrugis, but can be distinguished by differences in distribution, visible morphology, and microscopic characteristics.

L. volemus is widely distributed in the Northern Hemisphere, in temperate regions of Eurasia and North America, as well as some subtropical and tropical regions of Asia. A mycorrhizal fungus, its fruit bodies grow on the ground at the base of various species of trees from summer to autumn, either individually or in groups. It is valued as an edible mushroom and is sold in some Asian markets.

== Taxonomy ==
The first mention of Lactifluus volemus in the scientific literature was in Carl Linnaeus's 1753 Species Plantarum, under the name Agaricus lactifluus. In 1821, Swedish mycologist Elias Magnus Fries called it Agaricus volemus in his Systema Mycologicum. In this work he proposed a grouping of related species (called a tribus, or tribe) within the genus Agaricus, which he named Galorrheus. Fries later recognised Lactarius as a distinct genus in his 1838 Epicrisis Systematis Mycologici, citing Galorrheus as a synonym. Although Linnaeus had published the species before Fries, Fries's name is sanctioned and thus has nomenclatural priority. In 1871, Paul Kummer raised most of Fries's tribes to generic rank, and so renamed the species Galorrheus volemus. The variety L. volemus var. subrugosus was identified by Charles Horton Peck in 1879, but is now classified as a separate species, L. corrugis. In 1891, Otto Kuntze moved the species into Lactifluus, which was afterwards long considered a synonym of Lactarius but confirmed as a separate genus through molecular phylogenetics in 2008 and subsequent taxonomical rearrangements within the family Russulaceae.

Another historical synonym is Lactarius lactifluus, used by Lucien Quélet in 1886, a renaming based on Linnaeus's Agaricus lactifluus. Lactarius wangii, reported by Hua-An Wen and Jian-Zhe Ying to be a new species from China in 2005, was synonymised two years later with L. volemus.

The specific epithet "volemus" is derived from the Latin vola, meaning "the hollow of the hand", suggestive of Fries's reference to the large amount of latex "flowing enough to fill the hand". Common names for L. volemus include the weeping milk cap, the tawny milkcap, the orange-brown milky, the voluminous-latex milky, the lactarius orange, the fishy milkcap, and the apricot milk cap. In the West Virginian mountains of the United States, the mushroom is called a "leatherback" or a "bradley". The latter name may originate from its German name Brätling.

=== Phylogeny ===
- - - - - - L. volemus A-1
          - - L. volemus A-2
            - L. volemus A-3
        - - L. corrugis B-1
          - L. corrugis B-2
        - - L. volemus C-1
          - L. volemus C-2
      - L. hygrophoroides
    - L. piperatus
  - - Lactarius subumbonatus
    - Lactarius lignyotus

Phylogeny of the Lactifluus volemus group based on large subunit rDNA sequences. L. volemus and L. corrugis specimens are distinguished based on differences in colour or distribution: A-1, velvet type; A-2 red type; A-3, Chinese type; B-1, red type; B-2, common type; C-1, common in Japan; C-2, yellow type.

Lactifluus volemus was the type species of the section Dulces in subgenus Lactarius, and is currently classified in Lactifluus section Lactifluus. The group around this L. volemus includes species with a dry cap, abundant latex, and a white or pale cream spore print. Because the closely related L. corrugis has overlapping morphological characters, including similar colouration in the cap and stem, it has been difficult to reliably distinguish between the two species. The difficulty in discerning the two is exacerbated by the fact that both species have several colour forms: Japanese specimens of L. volemus may have a red cap, a yellow cap with a long stem, or a velvet-like surface texture; the caps of L. corrugis may be either red, commonly rust-coloured.

In 2005, Japanese researchers clarified the relationships between these two species and others in section Dulces using molecular phylogenetics, and by comparing differences in fatty acid composition, morphology, and taste. The colour variants group phylogenetically into different subclades, suggesting that they might better be considered as "different species, subspecies, or varieties". A 2010 molecular study of L. volemus of northern Thailand found that 79 tested specimens could be divided into 18 distinct phylogenetic species; six of these were described as new species: Lactifluus acicularis, L. crocatus, L. distantifolius, L. longipilus, L. pinguis and L. vitellinus.

== Description ==
The fruit body of L. volemus has a fleshy and firm cap with a velvety or smooth surface and a shape that changes with maturity: it starts off convex, with edges curved inwards, then later grows flat with a depression in the middle. With a typical diameter of 5 to 11 cm (2–4 1/2 in), its colour ranges from apricot to tawny. The cap colouration, however, is somewhat variable, as has been noted in Asian, European, and North American specimens. The stem, whose height varies between 4 and 12 cm (1 1/2 and 5 in), and which is typically between 1 and 1.5 cm (3/8 and 5/8 in) thick, has a slightly lighter colouration than the cap. It is firm, with a velvety or smooth surface that sometimes has depressions running longitudinally up and down its length.

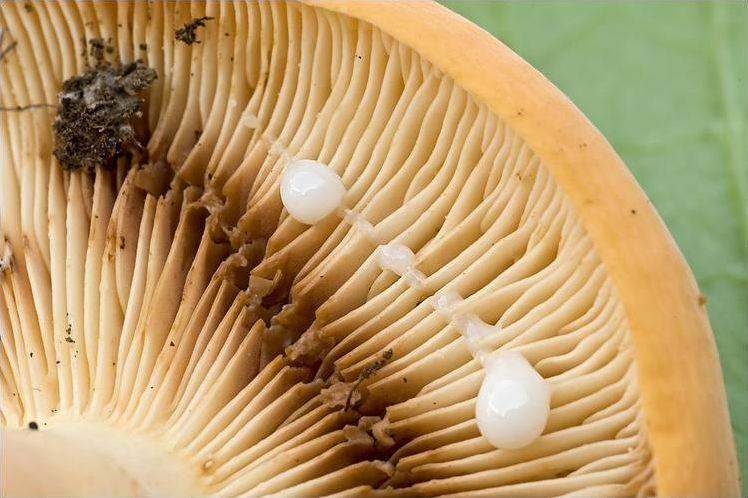
The profuse whitish latex may become brownish upon exposure to air, and stains tissues brown.

The gills are adnate to slightly decurrent, brittle, narrow, quite closely spaced and sometimes forked. Normally a pale golden yellow colour, the gills turn brown when bruised. Interspersed between the gills are lamellulae, short gills that do not extend to the stem. The flesh is whitish and firm. The mushroom smells somewhat fishy; one source suggests the odour is "like a dead shad, which anglers will tell you is probably the most malodorous freshwater fish". The odour is concentrated when the fruit bodies are dried. One of the mushroom's most distinctive features is the abundant latex, so plentiful that a small nick on the gills will cause it to "weep" the milky substance. The latex tends to impart brown stains on whatever it contacts.

=== Micromorphology ===
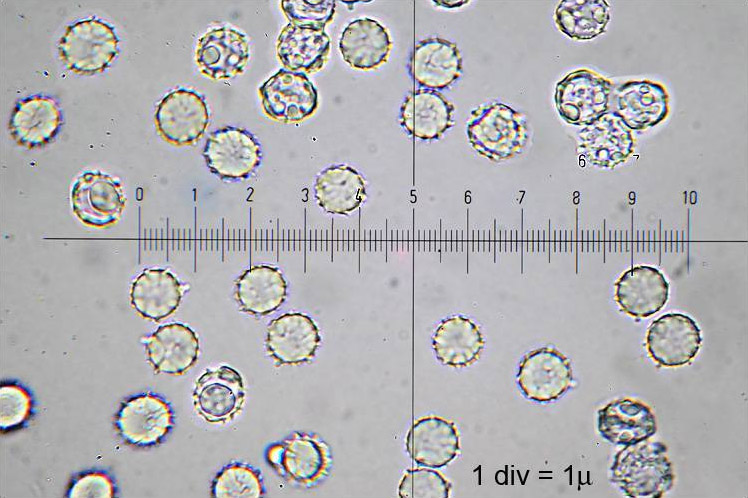
Spores are spherical, hyaline, and reticulate.

The spore print is whitish. The spores are roughly spherical, translucent (hyaline), and typically measure 7.5–10.0 by 7.5–9.0 μm. The spore surface is reticulate—covered with ridges that form a complete network. The ridges are up to 0.8 μm high and have conspicuous projections up to 1.2 μm high. The spore-bearing cells of the hymenium, the basidia, are club-shaped, hyaline, four-spored, and have dimensions of 40–62 by 7.2–10.4 μm. Interspersed among the basidia are sterile cells called cystidia. The pleurocystidia (cystidia on the side of a gill) are roughly spindle- to club-shaped, and measure 48–145 by 5–13 μm. The cheilocystidia (cystidia on the edge of a gill) may be spindle-, club-, or awl-shaped (subulate), or intermediate in between these forms, and measure 27–60 by 5–7 μm. Additionally, there are cystidia present on both the surface of the cap and the stem. If a drop of ferric sulphate (used as a chemical test in mushroom identification) is applied to the mushroom flesh, it will immediately stain dark bluish-green.

=== Varieties ===
The variety Lactifluus volemus var. flavus was described by Alexander H. Smith and Lexemuel Ray Hesler in their 1979 monograph of North American Lactarius species. This rare variety, found in the southeastern United States (ranging from South Carolina to Florida and extending west to Texas), has a cap that stays yellow throughout its development. It also has slightly smaller spores than the regular variety: 6.5–9.0 by 6–8 μm. It is also a good edible. Some authors have considered the rarely collected L. volemus var. oedematopus, found in central and southern Europe, to be a distinct variety distinguished from the common variety by a darker reddish-brown cap and a swollen stem. This assessment is not universally accepted, possibly because it falls within the range of morphological variation shown by the main variety. L. volemus var. asiaticus was named in 2004 based on Vietnamese specimens; associating with Khasi pine (Pinus khasya), it has small, dull brown, velvety fruit bodies. In general, little taxonomical significance has been ascribed to the several varieties of L. volemus that have been proposed.

=== Similar species ===
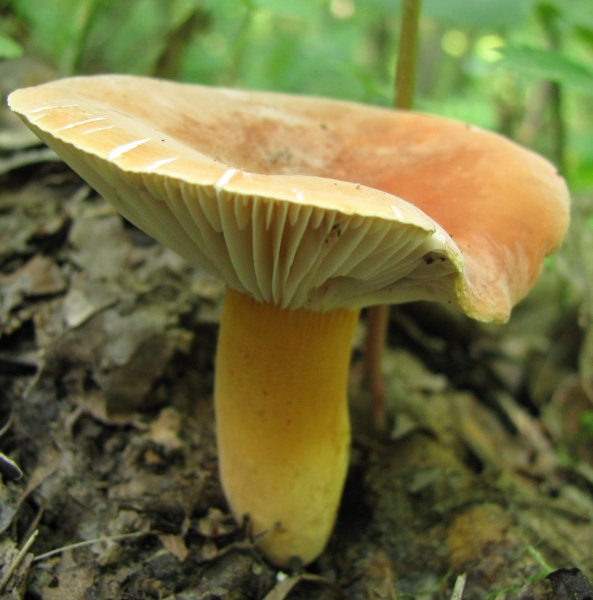
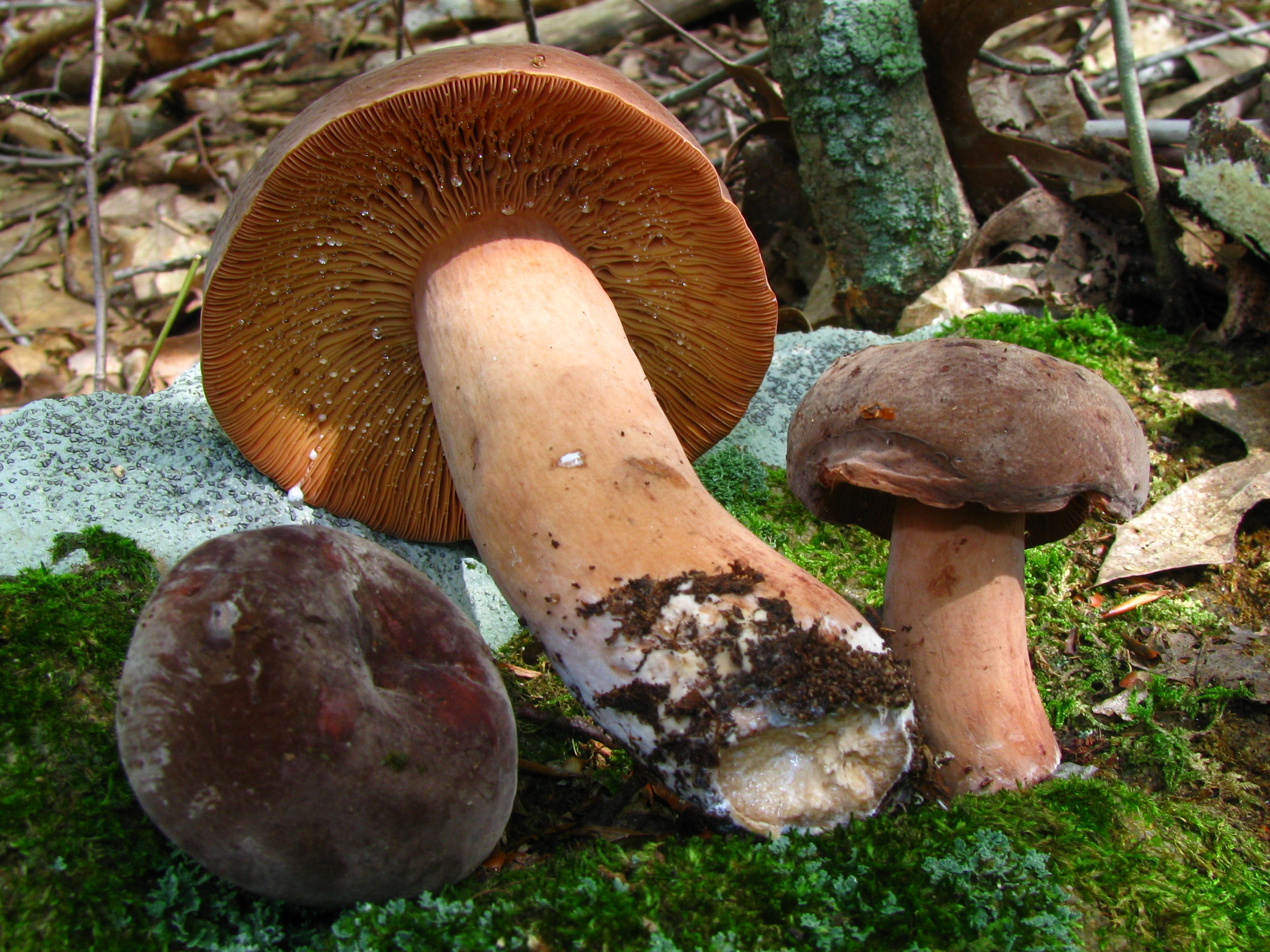
L. hygrophoroides (left) and L. corrugis (right) are lookalikes.

Lactifluus volemus is closely related to L. corrugis, and generally similar in appearance. L. corrugis usually has more surface wrinkles, darker gills, weaker or absent scent, and less orange colouration; however, intermediate colour forms can be found. The two can be distinguished more definitively by microscopic characteristics: L. corrugis has larger spores—typically 10.4–12.8 by 9.6–11.8 μm—with a coarser surface reticulum, and larger pleurocystidia. The species Lactifluus austrovolemus is closely related, but has more crowded gills, while L. lamprocystidiatus can only be reliably distinguished from L. volemus by microscopic characteristics: the reticulations on its spores are taller and more acute, and the meshes formed by the intersections of the reticulations are smaller. Both L. austrovolemus and L. lamprocystidiatus are known only from Papua New Guinea. Lactifluus hygrophoroides also resembles L. volemus, but differs in having widely spaced gills, and spores that lack surface reticulations.

Some species of the genus Lactarius are also similar: The tropical African Lactarius chromospermus has a superficial resemblance to L. volemus, but the former species, in addition to its African distribution, can be identified by its cinnamon-brown spore print—unique in the Russulaceae. Lactarius subvelutinus is also similar, but lacks the fishy odour, has a dull yellow-orange to bright golden orange cap, narrow gills, and a white latex that does not change colour.

== Habitat and distribution ==
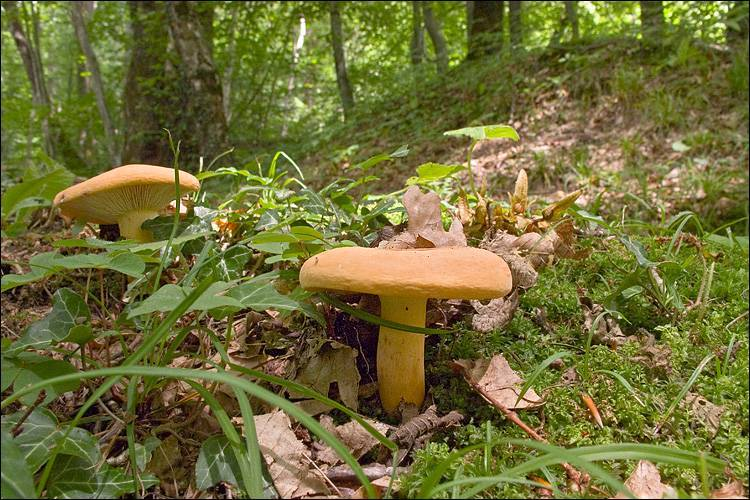
Specimens in mixed forest, found in Bovec basin, East Julian Alps, Slovenia

Like all milk caps, L. volemus forms ectomycorrhizae, mutually beneficial symbiotic associations with various tree species. In this association, the fungal hyphae grow around the root of the plant and between its cortical cells, but do not actually penetrate them. The hyphae extend outward into the soil, increasing the surface area for absorption to help the plant absorb nutrients from the soil. It is found growing at the base of both coniferous and broad-leaved trees, although it is more common in deciduous woods. It may also sometimes be found in peat moss beds. The fruit bodies, which appear between summer and autumn, are common. They can be found growing solitarily or in groups, and are more abundant in warm and humid weather.

Lactifluus volemus is found in warm temperate regions and as well as some subtropical and tropical regions of the Northern Hemisphere. The fungus is widely distributed throughout Europe, although it is in decline in some countries, and has become rare enough in the Netherlands (and Flanders) to be considered locally extinct. It is known from Asia, including China (Qinling Mountains, Guizhou Province, and Yunnan Province), Japan, India, Korea, Nepal, and Vietnam. Collections have also been made from the Middle East, including Iran and Turkey. In North America, it can be found in southeast Canada, on the East Coast of the United States and Mexico, and in Central America (Guatemala).

== Ecology ==
The fruit bodies can be inhabited by species of limoniid flies, such as Discobola marginata or Limonia yakushimensis, as well as several species of fungi-dwelling mites. The flies are hosts for the mites in a symbiotic association known as phoresis, whereby the mites are mechanically carried by its host. Mites are small and unable to migrate the relatively long distances between mushrooms without assistance; the insect hosts, in comparison, are large and can transfer the mites between their preferred feeding habitats.

Adults of the pleasing fungus beetle Tritoma angulata have been recorded from this mushroom, but it does not seem to be a regular food source for them.

== Uses ==
Lactarius volemus, dried
Nutritional value per 100 g (3.5 oz)
- Energy: 1,631 kJ (390 kcal)
- Carbohydrates: 64 g
- Fat: 4 g
- Protein: 25.2 g
Vitamins and minerals
Minerals	Quantity %DV^{†}
Copper	200% 1.8 mg
Iron	8% 1.5 mg
Manganese	61% 1.4 mg
Zinc	30% 3.3 mg
- ^{†}Percentages estimated using US recommendations for adults.

Despite the unappealing fishy scent that develops after the mushroom is picked, Lactifluus volemus is edible and recommended for culinary usage, though, typical of milk caps, it has a slightly granular texture that some may find unappetizing. The odor disappears during cooking. The latex only has a mild taste. The species is considered good for novice mushroom hunters to eat, and is best prepared by slow cooking to prevent it from becoming too hard; specimens that have been rehydrated after having been dried will require longer cooking times to eliminate the grainy texture. The mushroom has also been suggested for use in casseroles and thick sauces. Pan frying is not a recommended cooking technique, due to the large amounts of latex it exudes. The species has been found to be a good source of protein and carbohydrates.

L. volemus is one of several species of milk caps sold in rural markets in Yunnan Province, China, and it is among the most popular wild edible mushrooms collected for consumption and sale in Nepal. In their 2009 book on milk caps of North America, Bessette and colleagues consider the mushroom "the best-known and most popular edible milk mushroom" in the eastern U.S.

Two elderly people developed a transient pancreatitis after consuming L. volemus in central Anatolia in Turkey. Both had eaten the mushroom, which they knew as Tirmit, many times before. The condition resolved spontaneously.

=== Bioactive compounds ===
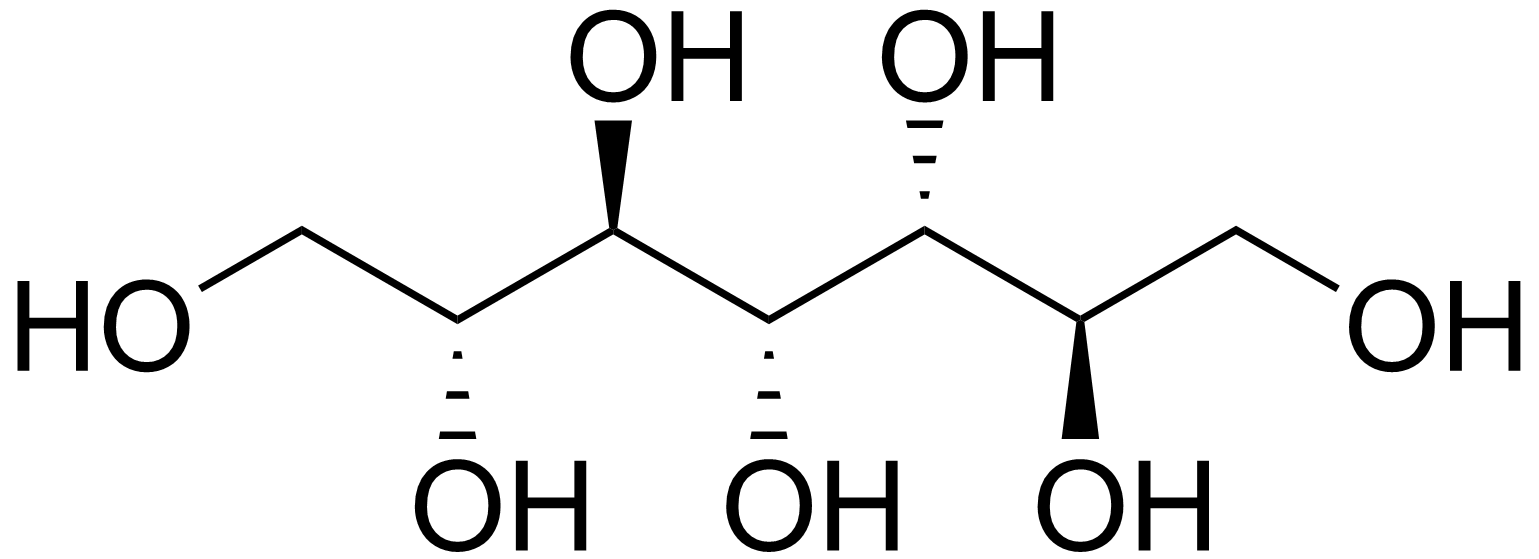
Volemitol

Fruit bodies contains a unique sterol molecule called volemolide, a derivative of the common fungal sterol ergosterol that may have application in fungal chemotaxonomy. A 2001 study identified a further nine sterols, three of which were previously unknown to science. According to the authors, these types of highly oxygenated compounds—similar to sterols found in marine soft coral and sponges—are rare in fungi. The mushroom also contains volemitol (D-glycero-D-mannoheptitol), a seven-carbon sugar alcohol first isolated from the species by the French scientist Émile Bourquelot in 1889. Volemitol occurs as a free sugar in many plant and brown algal species.

Due to their natural polyisoprene content (1.1–7.7% by dry weight of fruit bodies), L. volemus fruit bodies can also be used to produce rubber. The chemical structure of rubber from the mushroom consists of a high molecular mass homologue of polyprenol, arranged as a dimethylallyl group, two trans isoprene units, a long sequence of cis isoprenes (between 260 and 300 units), terminated by a hydroxyl or fatty acid ester. Biosynthetically, the creation of the polyisoprene begins with the compound trans,trans-farnesyl pyrophosphate, and is thought to terminate by esterification of polyisoprenyl pyrophosphate. The enzyme isopentenyl-diphosphate delta isomerase has been identified as required for the initiation of rubber synthesis in L. volemus and several other milk cap species.

== See also ==
- List of Lactifluus species
