= Edible mushroom =

Edible fungi fruit bodies

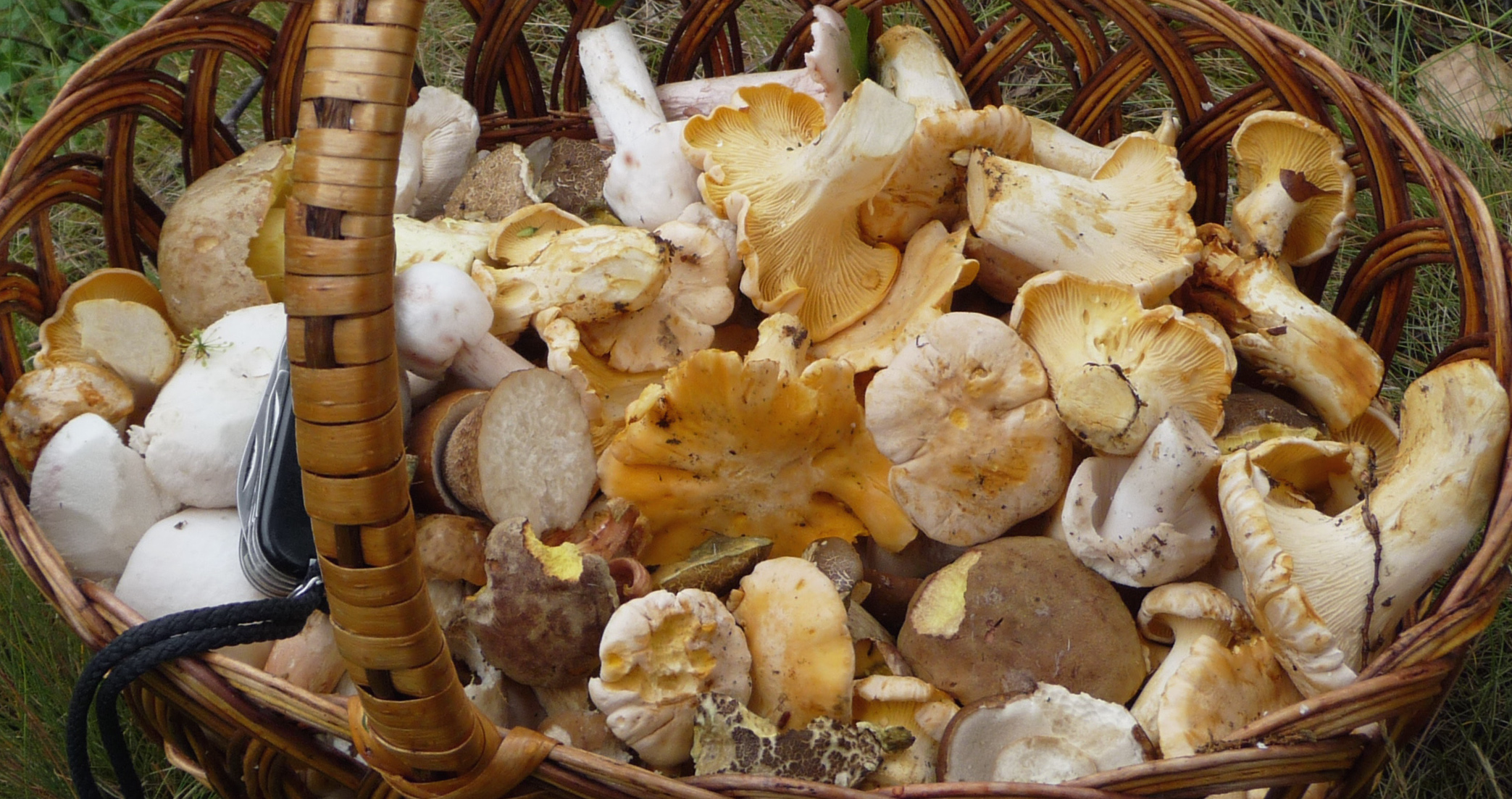
Assorted wild edible mushrooms

Edible mushrooms are the fleshy fruit bodies of numerous species of properly identified and prepared fungi. Edibility may be defined by criteria including their palatability and absence of dangerous mycotoxins. Edible mushrooms are consumed for their nutritional and culinary value, often either being cultivated or harvested wild. Easily cultivated and common wild mushrooms are often available in markets; those that are more difficult to obtain may be collected on a smaller scale.

To ensure safety, wild mushrooms must be correctly identified before their edibility can be assumed. Deadly poisonous mushrooms that are frequently confused with edible mushrooms include several species of the genus Amanita, particularly A. phalloides (the death cap). Some mushrooms that are edible for most people can cause allergic reactions in others; old or improperly stored specimens can cause food poisoning. Additionally, mushrooms can absorb chemicals from polluted locations, accumulating pollutants and potentially lethal heavy metals.

Psychoactive mushrooms can also be confused with edible species. Additionally, mushrooms were consumed medicinally in traditional medicine, but are not upheld by evidence. Edible species typically must be cooked, sometimes requiring parboiling or slow cooking to destroy toxins, with only select species able to be eaten raw. Many can also be canned, dried, pickled, or salted.

== Description ==
Edibility may be defined by criteria including desirable taste and aroma and the absence of poisonous effects on humans. Edible mushrooms are consumed for their nutritional and culinary value. Mushrooms, especially dried shiitake, are sources of umami flavor. Edible mushrooms include many fungal species that are either harvested wild or cultivated.

Wild mushrooms can appear either below ground (hypogeous) or above ground (epigeous) and can be picked by hand. Correct identification is required to prevent the confusion of potentially fatal poisonous mushrooms with edible ones. Some edible species cannot be identified without the use of advanced techniques such as chemistry or microscopy.

Easily cultivated and common wild mushrooms are often available in grocery stores and farmers' markets when in season; those that are more difficult to obtain (such as the truffle, matsutake, and morel) may be collected on a smaller scale and are sometimes even sold as luxury items. Mushrooms can be purchased fresh and many are also sold dried. Many species require cooking to eliminate toxicity.

== List of provisionally edible mushrooms ==
Mushroom image	Part image	Scientific name	Common name	Description	Distribution	Cultivation	Edibility
		Agaricus arvensis	Horse mushroom	Up to 20 cm (8 in) wide; resembles deadly Amanita species	Britain and North America	Harvested wild	Edible for most people, but can resemble deadly Amanitas
		Agaricus bisporus	Button mushroom, common mushroom, cremini, portobello, and others	As it ages, it turns from small, white and smooth to large and light brown.	Widespread in rich soil	Widely cultivated	Edible and widely consumed
		Agaricus campestris	Field mushroom	Up to 12 cm (4 1/2 in) wide; resembles deadly Amanitas	Widespread in grasses	Harvested wild	Choice, but can resemble poisonous species
		Agaricus silvaticus	Pinewood mushroom	Up to 10 cm wide		Harvested wild	Edible cooked, but resembles some inedible species
		Aleuria aurantia	Orange peel fungus	Up to 10 cm wide, orange, cup-shaped, and fuzzy	Europe and North America	Harvested wild	Edible but difficult to collect
		Amanita caesarea	Caesar's Amanita	Orange to red cap, up to 20 cm wide; resembles the poisonous Amanita muscaria	North Africa, Eurasia, and North America	Harvested wild	Edible, reportedly raw and cooked
		Amanita fulva	Tawny grisette	Up to 10 cm wide; resembles poisonous Amanitas	Europe and North America		Edible cooked
		Amanita muscaria	Fly agaric	Red cap with white warts; up to 30 cm wide	Widespread; symbiotic with various trees		Parboiling is required. When fresh, it contains the hallucinogen muscimol and some ibotenic acid.
		Amanita rubescens	Blusher	Up to 15 cm wide; resembles related species	Eurasia, western North America		Edible when cooked, which destroys a toxin
		Armillaria mellea	Honey mushroom	Up to 15 cm wide	Eurasia, North America	Harvested wild	Edible, usually excluding the tough stalk; best when young and well-cooked
		Boletus edulis	Porcino	Reddish-brown cap up to 30 cm or more wide	Widespread in Northern Hemisphere	Commercially harvested	Choice
		Boletus pinophilus	Pine bolete	Cap up to 40 cm wide	Eurasia	Commercially harvested	Reportedly edible
		Boletus variipes		Tannish cap	Eastern North America with hardwoods	Commercially harvested	Choice
		Calbovista subsculpta	Sculptured giant puffball	Up to 15 cm (6 in) wide	Western North America in montane areas	Commercially harvested	Choice while the gleba is still firm and white
		Calocybe gambosa	St. George's mushroom	Up to 15 cm wide	Europe from spring to summer	Harvested wild	Edible cooked or pickled
		Calvatia cyathiformis	Purple-spored puffball	Up to 20 cm wide	North America and Australia	Harvested wild	Reportedly edible when young
		Calvatia gigantea	Giant puffball	Up to 60 cm (20 in) wide and 20 kilograms (45 lb)	Temperate areas around the world in meadows, fields, and deciduous forests from late summer and autumn	Commercially harvested	Choice when immature and white, but may cause a laxative effect
		Cantharellus cibarius	Golden chanterelle	Up to 15 cm wide	Europe	Commercially harvested	Choice but resembles some poisonous mushrooms
		Cerioporus squamosus	Dryad's saddle and pheasant's back mushroom	Up to 30 cm or more wide	Europe and eastern U.S.	Harvested wild	Edible young and cooked
		Chroogomphus	Pine-spikes or spike-caps		Northern Hemisphere	Harvested wild	Some edible species
		Collybia nuda	Blewit	Up to 15 cm wide; may resemble toxic Cortinarius species	Europe and North America	Commercially harvested	Edible
		Collybia personata (syn. Lepista saeva)	Field blewit or blue leg	Up to 12 cm wide	Europe		Edible
		Coprinopsis atramentaria (syn. Coprinus atramentarius)	Common inkcap	Up to 10 cm wide	Northern Hemisphere and Australia		Edible when young but toxic if consumed with alcohol due to the presence of coprine
		Coprinus comatus	Shaggy mane, shaggy inkcap or lawyer's wig	Up to 8 cm wide	North America in grasslands and meadows	Harvested wild	Must be cooked as soon as possible after harvesting or the caps will deliquesce (turn to 'ink')
		Cortinarius caperatus	Gypsy mushroom	Tannish cap, up to 12 cm wide	Northern Europe and northern North America	Commercially harvested	Choice, but can resemble some poisonous European species
		Craterellus cornucopioides	Trumpet of death or horn of plenty	Up to 8 cm wide	Eurasia, North America, and Australia	Commercially harvested	Choice
		Craterellus tubaeformis	Tube chanterelle or yellowfoot	Up to 4 cm wide	North America and Asia	Commercially harvested	Choice
		Cyclocybe aegerita	Poplar fieldcap	Up to 10 cm wide	Grows on poplars and other trees	Commercially cultivated in Asia and Australia	Difficult to identify
		Cyttaria espinosae			Chile	Harvested wild	Edible
		Fistulina hepatica	Beefsteak polypore or ox tongue	Up to 6 cm wide	Europe and North America	Harvested wild	Edible but older specimens should be soaked overnight then cooked to avoid gastric upset
		Flammulina filiformis	Enoki	Up to 4.5 cm wide	Asia	Commercially cultivated	Asian cuisine
		Flammulina velutipes	Velvet shank	Up to 10 cm wide	Europe and North America	Harvested wild	Edible cooked, best with the skin removed
		Gomphidius glutinosus	Slimy spike-cap	Up to 12 cm wide	Eurasia and North America	Harvested wild	Edible but possibly not recommended; accumulates heavy metals
		Grifola frondosa	Hen of the woods or sheep's head	Up to 50 cm wide	Eastern North America and Eurasia	Commercially harvested	Choice but some may be allergic
		Gyromitra esculenta	False morel, turban or brain mushroom	Up to 12 cm wide	North America and Central Europe		Parboiling required to reduce gyromitrin toxicity, which may not be fully effective
		Handkea utriformis (syn. Calvatia utriformis)		Puffball, up to 25 cm wide	Widespread in northern temperate zones	Harvested wild	Edible when immature and white
		Hericium erinaceus	Lion's mane	Tooth fungus up to 40 cm wide	Europe and North America	Commercially harvested	Best when young
		Hydnum repandum	Sweet tooth or hedgehog mushroom	Up to 17 cm or more wide	Europe and North America	Commercially harvested	Choice; cooking removes bitterness in older specimens
		Hygrophorus chrysodon	Gold flecked woodwax	Up to 14 cm wide	Northern Hemisphere	Harvested wild	Edible but bland
		Hypsizygus tessulatus	Beech mushroom	Cap up to 15 cm wide	North America	Commercially cultivated	Tough flesh
		Imleria badia	Bay bolete	Up to 10 cm wide	Eurasia and North America	Harvested wild	Edible but allergenic for some
		Kalaharituber pfeilii		Up to 12 cm wide	Southern Africa	Harvested wild	Edible
		Laccocephalum mylittae	Blackfellow's bread	Sclerotium grows up to 60 cm wide	Australia	Harvested wild	Edible but not choice
		Lactarius corrugis	Corrugated-cap milky	Brownish-red cap up to 12 cm wide	Eastern North America with oak, July–Sept.		Choice
		Lactarius deliciosus	Saffron milk cap	Up to 20 cm wide	Europe	Commercially harvested	Not necessarily choice, but popular in Russia
		Lactarius deterrimus	Orange milkcap	Up to 12 cm wide	Eurasia	Harvested wild	Edible
		Lactarius hygrophoroides		Up to 8 cm wide	Eastern North America with oak, June–Sept.		Edible
		Lactarius indigo	Indigo milk cap	Blue cap, fading to grayish; up to 15 cm wide	Northern Hemisphere	Harvested wild	Edible
		Lactarius paradoxus		Blue-green to gray cap; up to 8 cm wide	Southern and eastern U.S., autumn–winter		Edible but bitter with age
		Lactarius rubrilacteus		Cap up to 14 cm wide	Western North America, June–Oct.	Harvested wild	Edible but grainy
		Lactarius subdulcis	Mild milkcap	Up to 7 cm wide	Europe	Harvested wild	Edible when cooked but not choice
		Lactarius volemus	Fishy milkcap	Up to 11 cm wide	Eurasia and North America	Harvested wild	Edible but grainy; best slow-cooked
		Laetiporus sulphureus	Sulphur shelf, chicken mushroom	A distinct bracket fungus	Europe and North America	Harvested wild	Edible when watery, after cooking
		Leccinum aurantiacum	Red-capped scaber stalk	Orange-red cap, up to 15 cm wide	Europe	Harvested wild	Edible cooked, with risk of toxicity; linked to one death
		Leccinum scabrum	Birch bolete	Up to 10 cm wide	Europe, North America and New Zealand	Harvested wild	Edible when firm
		Leccinum versipelle (syn. Boletus testaceoscaber)	Orange birch bolete	Orangish cap, up to 15 cm wide	Europe, Aug.–Nov.	Harvested wild	Edible cooked
		Lentinula edodes	Shiitake		Southeast Asia	Commercially cultivated worldwide	Edible; may cause dermatitis for some unless cooked
		Macrolepiota procera	Parasol mushroom	Up to 25 cm wide	Eurasia	Harvested wild	Choice but resembles some poisonous species
		Marasmius oreades	Fairy ring champignon	Up to 5 cm wide	Europe and North America	Harvested wild	Choice
		Morchella spp. including Morchella esculenta	Morels	Can resemble poisonous false morels including Gyromitra esculenta	Northern Hemisphere; open scrub, woodland or open ground in late spring	Commercially harvested; difficult to grow commercially	Potentially toxic if uncooked or consumed with alcohol
		Phallus indusiatus	Basket stinkhorn	Cap up to 4 cm wide; stem up to 25 cm long	Tropical regions	Commercially cultivated	Asian cuisine
		Pleurotus ostreatus	Oyster mushroom	Up to 30 cm wide; resembles toxic species	Widespread in temperate and subtropical areas	Commercially cultivated at an industrial scale	Choice but resembles inedible Lentinellus species
		Pseudohydnum gelatinosum	Toothed jelly fungus	Up to 7 cm wide and tall	Eurasia	Harvested wild	Edible
		Sparassis crispa	Cauliflower mushroom	Up to 24 cm across	Europe	Harvested wild	Edible when young; best slow-cooked
		Stropharia rugosoannulata	Wine cap	Up to 30 cm wide	North America	Commercially cultivated	Choice
		Suillus bovinus	Bovine bolete	Up to 10 cm wide	Eurasia, South Africa, North America, and Australasia	Harvested wild	Edible
		Suillus brevipes	Short-stemmed slippery Jack	Up to 10 cm wide	North America	Harvested wild	Edible
		Suillus decipiens		Yellowish cap, up to 7 cm wide; yellow tubes	Southeastern North America	Harvested wild	Edible
		Suillus granulatus	Weeping bolete, granulated bolete	Brownish cap, up to 12 cm wide	Northern Hemisphere with pines	Harvested wild	Edible
		Suillus grevillei	Tamarack jack	Orangish cap, up to 10 cm wide	Eurasia and North America under larch	Harvested wild	Edible cooked, with the cap cuticle removed
		Suillus luteus	Slippery jack	Brownish cap, up to 10 cm or more wide	Northern Hemisphere	Harvested wild	Edible with the cap cuticle removed; allergenic for some
		Suillus spraguei	Painted suillus	Yellow cap with reddish scales; up to 12 cm wide	Eurasia and North America	Harvested wild	Edible
		Suillus tomentosus	Woolly-capped suillus	Up to 12 cm wide	North America	Harvested wild	Can cause gastric upset
		Tremella fuciformis	White jelly mushroom	Up to 7 cm across	Widespread in tropical areas	Commercially cultivated	Asian sweet dishes for texture
		Tricholoma matsutake	Matsutake	Up to 35 cm wide	Eurasia and northern North America in forests	Commercially harvested	Prized in Japanese cuisine but can resemble Inocybe pyriodora, a poisonous species with brown spores
		Tricholoma portentosum	Streaked tricholoma	Up to 11 cm wide	Europe and North America, coniferous woodland	Harvested wild	Edible but resembles poisonous relatives
		Tricholoma terreum	Grey knight	Up to 7 cm wide; resembles a poisonous species	Europe and North America		Edible but can cause rhabdomyolysis if eaten in large quantities
		Tuber aestivum	Summer truffle	Up to 10 cm wide	France, Italy and Spain	Commercially harvested	
		Tuber borchii	Bianchetto truffle			Commercially cultivated (experimental)	
		Tuber melanosporum	Black truffle	Up to 10 cm wide	Europe	Commercially cultivated	Choice
		Ustilago maydis	Corn smut		Pathogens of cereals	Harvested wild	Considered a delicacy in Mexico; used as fillings in quesadillas, tacos and soups
		Verpa bohemica	Wrinkled thimble-cap	Up to 4 cm wide	North America and Eurasia		Edible cooked, initially only in small portions; contains a toxin similar to gyromitrin
		Volvariella bombycina	Silky rosegill	Pale cap, up to 20 cm wide	Widespread but uncommon	Commercially cultivated	Edible
		Volvariella volvacea	Paddy straw mushroom or straw mushroom	Can resemble death caps when immature, when they are usually picked	Asia	Commercially cultivated	Edible with caution

== Cultivation ==
Mushroom and truffle production 2023, tonnes
China	47,143,126
Japan	462,158
United States	302,390
Poland	240,400
Netherlands	205,000
World	50,010,109
Source: FAOSTAT of the United Nations

Mushroom cultivation has a long history, with over twenty species commercially cultivated. Mushrooms are cultivated in at least 60 countries. A fraction of the many fungi consumed by humans are currently cultivated and sold commercially. Commercial cultivation is important ecologically, as there have been concerns of the depletion of larger fungi such as chanterelles in Europe, possibly because the group has grown popular yet remains a challenge to cultivate. Some mushrooms, particularly mycorrhizal species, have not yet been successfully cultivated.

In 2023, world production of commercial mushrooms and recorded truffle collection reported to the Food and Agriculture Organization was 50 million tonnes, led by China with 94% of the total (table).

== Safety concerns ==
Some wild species are toxic, or at least indigestible, when raw. Failure to identify poisonous mushrooms and confusing them with edible ones has resulted in death. Some mobile applications exist to aid with identification, but are unreliable on their own, especially those based on artificial intelligence.

Deadly poisonous mushrooms that are frequently confused with edible mushrooms and responsible for many fatal poisonings include several species of the genus Amanita, particularly A. phalloides (the death cap). Some mushrooms that are edible for most people can cause allergic reactions in some individuals with no prior knowledge of an allergy; old or improperly stored specimens can go rancid quickly and cause food poisoning. When eating any fungus for the first time, only a small quantity of one species should be consumed at a time, allowing for several hours to identify any potential allergic reaction. Even normally edible species of mushrooms may be dangerous, as certain mushrooms growing in polluted locations can act as chemical-absorbers, accumulating pollutants and heavy metals, including cadmium and arsenic, sometimes in lethal concentrations. On the other hand, cooking preparations may reduce the toxicity of certain slightly poisonous mushrooms (e.g. Morchellas) enough to be consumed.

Additionally, several varieties of fungi are known and documented to contain psychedelic drugs—the so-called magic mushrooms—yet resemble perfectly edible, non-psychoactive species. While not necessarily lethal to consume, to the uninitiated, an accidentally induced psychedelic experience can run the gamut from benign to terrifying, even depressing or psychotic. The most commonly consumed for recreational psychoactive use are Amanita muscaria (the fly agaric) and Psilocybe cubensis, with the former containing alkaloids such as muscimol and the latter predominately psilocybin. Both have the potential to induce in the user feelings of awe, wonder with nature, interesting visual hallucinations and inner peace (even in mild doses), but excessive or accidental consumption can create feelings of insanity, helplessness and fear, usually persisting for a few hours.

White mushrooms, boiled
Nutritional value per 100 g (3.5 oz)
- Energy: 117 kJ (28 kcal)
- Carbohydrates: 5.3 g
- Fat: 0.5 g
- Protein: 2.2 g
Vitamins and minerals
Vitamins	Quantity %DV^{†}
Thiamine (B1)	8% 0.1 mg
Riboflavin (B2)	23% 0.3 mg
Niacin (B3)	28% 4.5 mg
Pantothenic acid (B5)	44% 2.2 mg
Vitamin B6	6% 0.1 mg
Folate (B9)	5% 18 μg
Choline	4% 19.9 mg
Vitamin D	3% 21 IU
Vitamin K	0% 0 μg
Minerals	Quantity %DV^{†}
Calcium	0% 6 mg
Copper	56% 0.5 mg
Iron	9% 1.7 mg
Magnesium	3% 12 mg
Manganese	4% 0.1 mg
Phosphorus	7% 87 mg
Potassium	12% 356 mg
Selenium	24% 13.4 μg
Zinc	8% 0.9 mg
- Other constituents: Quantity
- Water: 91.1 g
- Link to Full USDA Database entry
- ^{†}Percentages estimated using US recommendations for adults, except for potassium, which is estimated based on expert recommendation from the National Academies.

== Nutrition ==
Boiled white mushrooms are 91% water, 5% carbohydrates, 2% protein, and 0.3% fat (table). In a reference amount of 100 grams (3.5 oz), boiled white mushrooms supply 28 calories of food energy and rich contents (20% or more of the Daily Value, DV) of riboflavin, niacin, and pantothenic acid, copper, and selenium (23-56% DV), with a moderate content of potassium (12% DV, table).

=== Vitamin D ===
The content of vitamin D is absent or low unless mushrooms are exposed to sunlight or purposely treated with artificial ultraviolet light, even after harvesting and being processed into dry powder.

Name	Chemical composition	Structure
Vitamin D_{1}	ergocalciferol with lumisterol, 1:1	
Vitamin D_{2}	ergocalciferol (made from ergosterol)	Note double bond at top center.
Vitamin D_{3}	cholecalciferol (made from 7-Dehydrocholesterol in the skin).	

When exposed to UV light before or after harvest, mushrooms convert their large concentrations of ergosterol into vitamin D_{2}. This is similar to the reaction in humans, where vitamin D_{3} is synthesized after exposure to sunlight.

Testing showed an hour of UV light exposure before harvesting made a serving of mushrooms contain twice the U.S. Food and Drug Administration's daily recommendation of vitamin D. With 5 minutes of artificial UV light exposure after harvesting, a serving of mushrooms contained four times as much. Slicing the mushrooms before UV expose can increase their content ten-fold. Analysis also demonstrated that natural sunlight produced vitamin D_{2}.

The form of vitamin D found in UV-irradiated mushrooms is ergocalciferol, or vitamin D_{2}. This is not the same as cholecalciferol, called vitamin D_{3}, which is produced by UV-irradiation of human or animal skin, fur, and feathers. Although vitamin D_{2} has vitamin-D activity in humans, and is widely used in food fortification and nutritional supplements, vitamin D_{3} is more commonly used in dairy and cereal products.

=== Research ===
A 2021 review of prospective studies found that eating mushrooms did not significantly affect risk factors for cardiovascular diseases.

== Uses ==
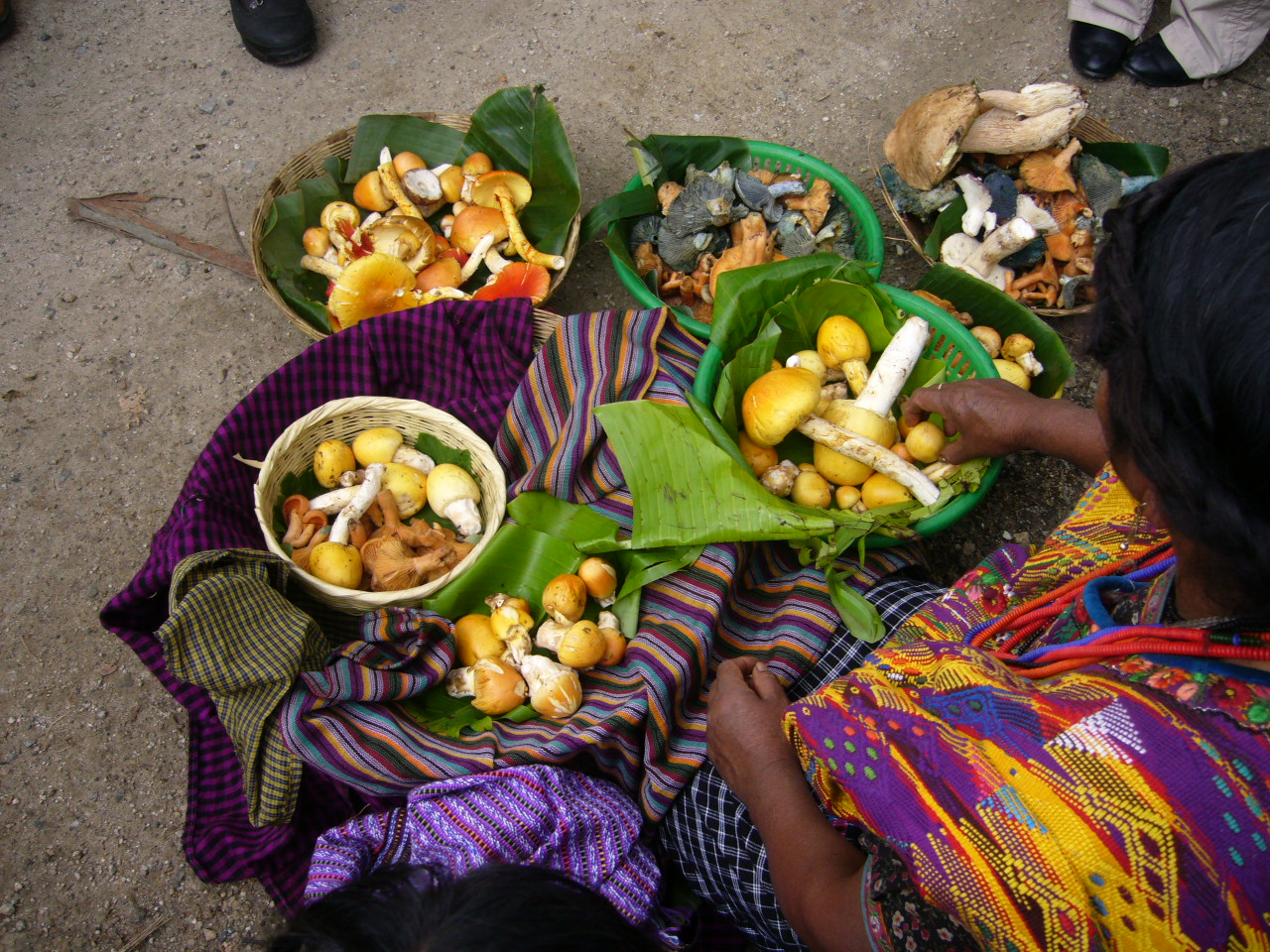
A vendor in Guatemala with a variety of mushrooms for sale

The accurate determination of and proper identification of a species is required to ensure its edibility and to safeguard against poisoning.

=== History ===
The earliest evidence of consumption of mushrooms comes from 13,000-year-old archaeological sites in Chile. Ötzi, the mummy of a man who lived between 3400 and 3100 BCE in Europe, was found with two types of mushroom in his belongings. Ancient Romans and Greeks, particularly the upper classes, used mushrooms for culinary purposes. Food tasters were employed by Roman emperors to ensure that mushrooms were safe to eat. The Forme of Cury, a 14th-century compilation of medieval English recipes, features a recipe of mushrooms and leeks cooked in broth.

=== Culinary ===
A minimal amount of water should be used to clean specimens, ideally in the field. Only select species can be safely eaten raw.

==== Cooking ====
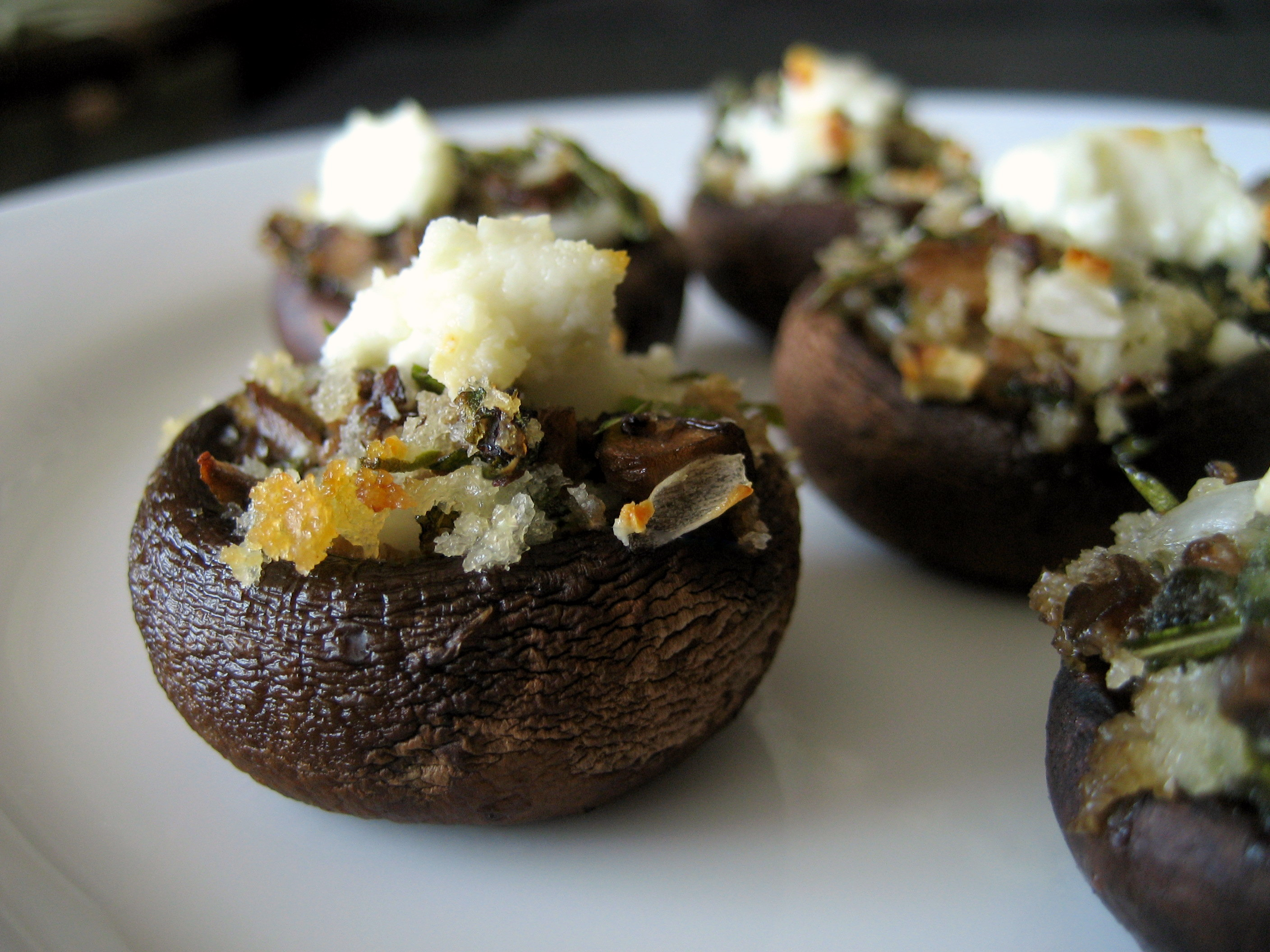
Stuffed mushrooms prepared using portobello mushrooms

Cooking mushrooms before consumption is often required, both to eliminate mycotoxins, including trace levels of toxic hydrazines, and also to improve palatability and texture. Frying, roasting, baking, and microwaving are all used to prepare mushrooms. Cooking lowers the amount of water present in the food. Chitin, a structural polymer in the cell walls of mushrooms, does not break down until 380 °C (716 °F), which is not reached in any normal cooking. However, chitin connections may be broken down by cooking, allowing for easier digestion.

==== Storage ====
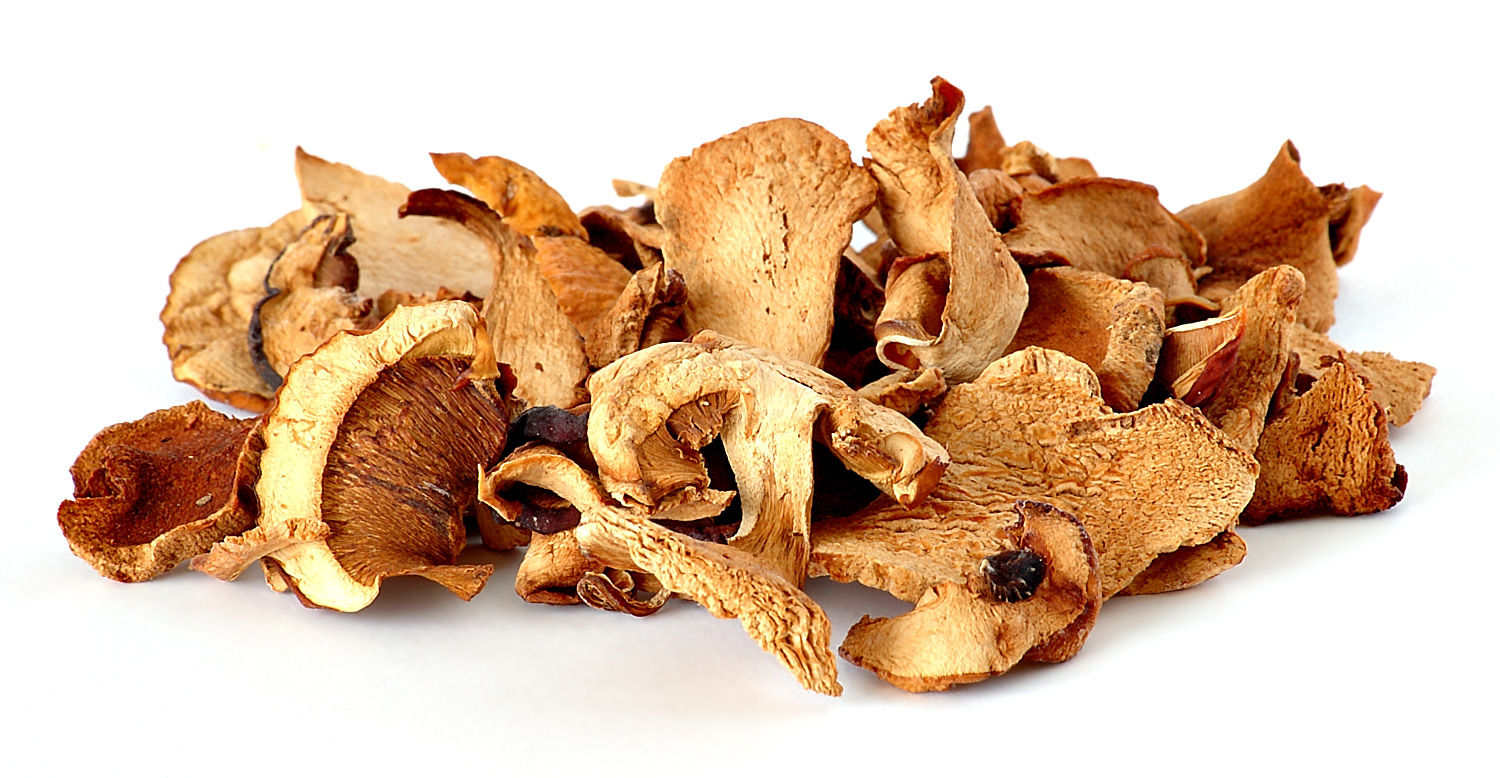
A collection of dried mushrooms

Mushrooms should be used as soon as possible, even if refrigerated (particularly Coprinus species). Mushrooms can be frozen, but they freeze best when cooked first. Those that do not require cooking can also be canned, dried, pickled, or salted.

=== In traditional medicine ===
Medicinal mushrooms are mushrooms or extracts from mushrooms that are thought to be treatments for diseases, yet remain unconfirmed in mainstream science and medicine, and so are not approved as drugs or medical treatments. Such use of mushrooms therefore falls into the domain of traditional medicine for which there is no direct high-quality clinical evidence of efficacy. (Since about the mid-20th century, some compounds found in fungi have been developed scientifically for medicine, e.g. antibiotics.)

Preliminary research on mushroom extracts has been conducted to determine if anti-disease properties exist, such as for polysaccharide-K or lentinan. Some extracts have widespread use in Japan, Korea and China, as potential adjuvants for radiation treatments and chemotherapy.

== See also ==
- List of foods
- List of Chinese mushrooms and fungi
- Mushroom diet
- Mushroom ketchup
- List of mushroom dishes
