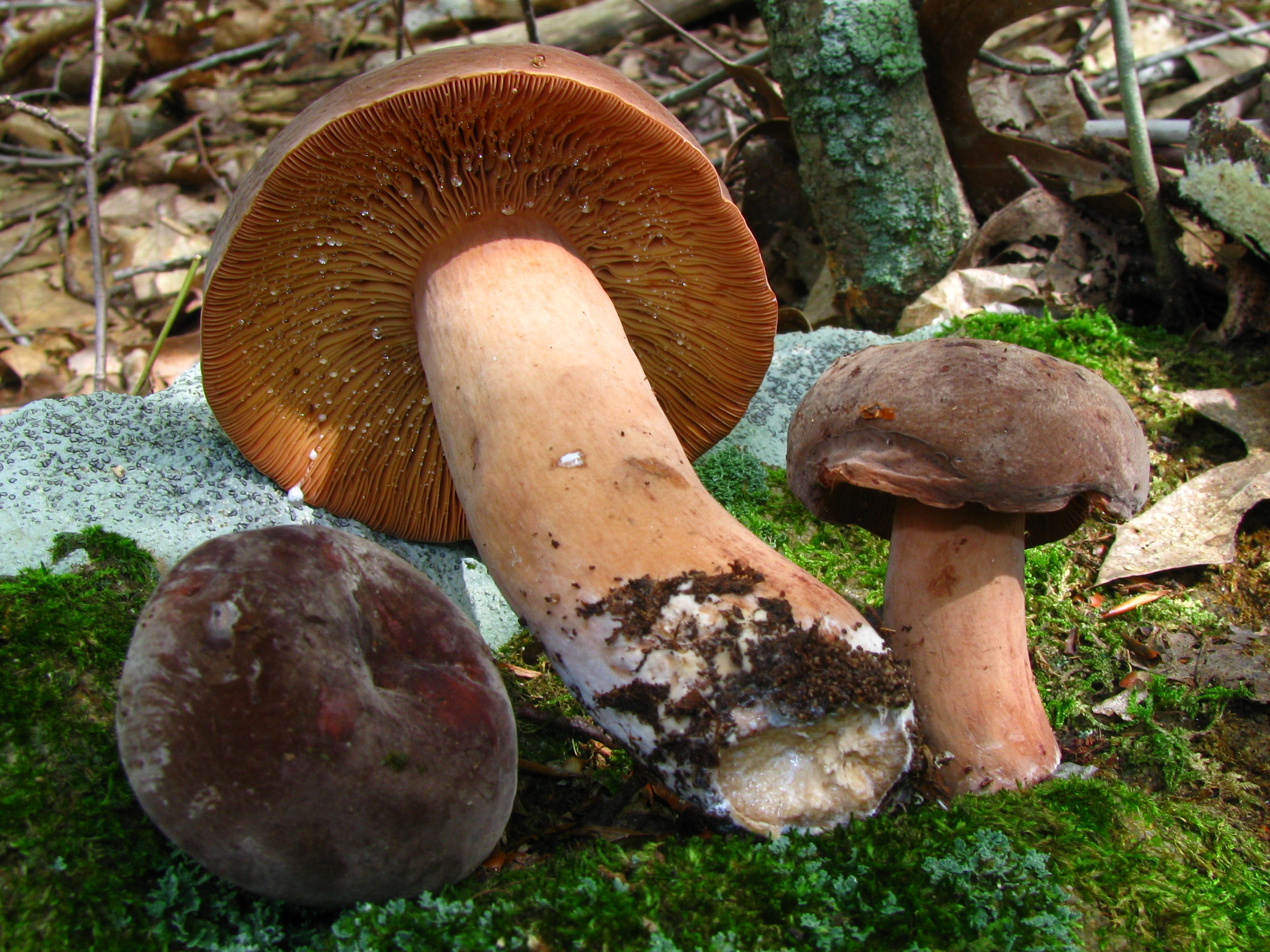

Scientific classification
- Kingdom: Fungi
- Division: Basidiomycota
- Class: Agaricomycetes
- Order: Russulales
- Family: Russulaceae
- Genus: Lactifluus
- Species: L. corrugis

Binomial name
- Lactifluus corrugis (Peck) Kuntze (1891)

Synonyms
- Lactarius corrugis Peck (1880)

= Lactifluus corrugis =

Species of fungus

Lactifluus corrugis
- Mycological characteristics
- Gills on hymenium
- Cap is convex or depressed
- Hymenium is adnate
- Stipe is bare
- Spore print is white
- Ecology is mycorrhizal
- Edibility is choice

Lactifluus corrugis (formerly Lactarius corrugis), commonly known as the corrugated-cap milky, is an edible species of fungus in the family Russulaceae.

== Taxonomy ==
The species was first described by American mycologist Charles Horton Peck in 1880.

== Description ==
The brownish-red cap is 4–12 centimetres (1 1/2–4 3/4 in) wide, and is usually dusted by a light bloom (turning dark when touched). The gills are light yellow and leak white latex, which stains brown. The stem is 4–13 cm (1 1/2–5 in) long and 1.5–2.5 cm (5/8–1 in). The spore print is white.

It resembles Lactifluus volemus, the latex of which also stains brown. Additionally, L. hygrophoroides has a pinkish-orange cap.

== Habitat and distribution ==
The mushroom can be found under oak trees in eastern North America between July and September.

== Uses ==
L. corrugis is considered a choice edible mushroom.

== See also ==
- List of Lactifluus species
