= Volemitol =

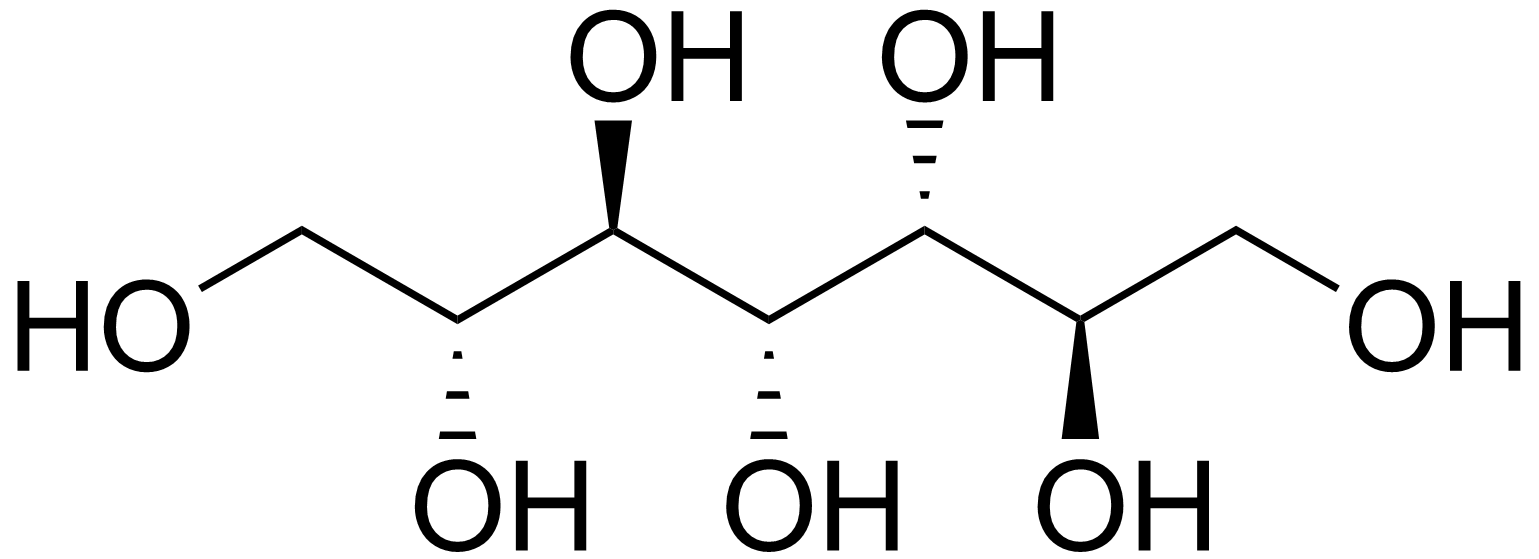
- Chemical structure of volemitol

Names
- IUPAC name D-glycero-D-manno-Heptitol
- Systematic IUPAC name (2R,3R,5R,6R)-Heptane-1,2,3,4,5,6,7-heptol
- Other names: D-glycero-D-talo-Heptitol; α-Sedoheptitol; β-Mannoheptitol

Identifiers
CAS Number	488-38-0
3D model (JSmol)	Interactive image
ChEBI	CHEBI:10017
ChemSpider	390172
ECHA InfoCard	100.006.978
EC Number	207-675-2
KEGG	C08260
PubChem CID	441439
UNII	Q4DGQ5L6AJ
CompTox Dashboard (EPA)	DTXSID701021103 DTXSID10897428, DTXSID701021103
- InChI: InChI=1S/C7H16O7/c8-1-3(10)5(12)7(14)6(13)4(11)2-9/h3-14H,1-2H2/t3-,4-,5-,6-/m1/s1 Key: OXQKEKGBFMQTML-KVTDHHQDSA-N
- SMILES: O[C@@H]([C@@H](O)C(O)[C@H](O)[C@H](O)CO)CO

Properties
Chemical formula	C_{7}H_{16}O_{7}
Molar mass	212.198 g·mol^{−1}
Melting point	152 to 153 °C (306 to 307 °F; 425 to 426 K)
- Except where otherwise noted, data are given for materials in their standard state (at 25 °C [77 °F], 100 kPa). verify (what is ?) Infobox references

Volemitol is a naturally occurring seven-carbon sugar alcohol. It is a substance widely distributed in plants, red algae, fungi, mosses, and lichens. It was also found in lipopolysaccharides from E. coli. In certain higher plants, such as Primula, volemitol plays several important physiological roles. It functions as a photosynthetic product, phloem translocate, and storage carbohydrate.

It is used as a natural sweetening agent.

Volemitol was first isolated as a white crystalline substance from the mushroom Lactarius volemus by the French scientist Émile Bourquelot in 1889.

== See also ==
- Sugar alcohol
- Sugar substitute
