= Limonia yakushimensis =

Scientific classification
- Domain: Eukaryota
- Kingdom: Animalia
- Phylum: Arthropoda
- Class: Insecta
- Order: Diptera
- Family: Limoniidae
- Genus: Limonia
- Species: L. yakushimensis

Binomial name
- Limonia yakushimensis Alexander, 1930

Species of fly

Limonia yakushimensis is a crane fly in the family Limoniidae. The species occurs in the Palearctic region. L. yakushimensis is known to rear its young in the fruit bodies of the fungus Lactarius volemus.
