= Lentinan =

Chemical compound

Clinical data
- AHFS/Drugs.com: International Drug Names
- ATC code: L03AX01 (WHO)

Identifiers
- CAS Number: 37339-90-5
- ChemSpider: none
- UNII: 6751655D1D
- KEGG: D01695
- ChEBI: CHEBI:31770
- CompTox Dashboard (EPA): DTXSID30190781

Chemical and physical data
- Molar mass: ~ 500,000 Da

Lentinan is a polysaccharide isolated from the fruit body of shiitake mushroom (Lentinula edodes).

== Chemistry ==
Lentinan is a β-1,3 beta-glucan with β-1,6 branching. It has a molecular weight of 500,000 Da and specific rotation of +14-22° (NaOH).

== Research ==
=== Preclinical studies ===
An in vitro experiment showed lentinan stimulated production of white blood cells in the human cell line U937. Lentinan is thought to be inactive in humans when given orally and is therefore administered intravenously. The authors of an in vivo study of lentinan suggested that the compound may be active when administered orally in mice.

=== Human clinical trials ===
Lentinan has been the subject of a limited number of clinical studies in cancer patients in Japan; however, evidence of efficacy is lacking.

=== Adverse effects ===
Lentinan has been reported to cause shiitake mushroom dermatitis.

== See also ==
- Medicinal mushrooms
