= Lactarius pinguis =

Scientific classification
- Kingdom: Fungi
- Division: Basidiomycota
- Class: Agaricomycetes
- Order: Russulales
- Family: Russulaceae
- Genus: Lactarius
- Species: L. pinguis

Binomial name
- Lactarius pinguis (2010)

Species of fungus

Lactarius pinguis is a member of the large milk-cap genus Lactarius in the order Russulales. Found in northern Thailand, it was described as new to science in 2010.

== See also ==
- List of Lactarius species
