= Lactarius lamprocystidiatus =

Scientific classification
- Kingdom: Fungi
- Division: Basidiomycota
- Class: Agaricomycetes
- Order: Russulales
- Family: Russulaceae
- Genus: Lactarius
- Species: L. lamprocystidiatus

Binomial name
- Lactarius lamprocystidiatus Verbeken & E.Horak (2000)

Species of fungus

Lactarius lamprocystidiatus is a member of the large milk-cap genus Lactarius in the order Russulales. Found in Papua New Guinea, it was first described scientifically by Verbeken and Horak in 2000.

== See also ==
- List of Lactarius species
