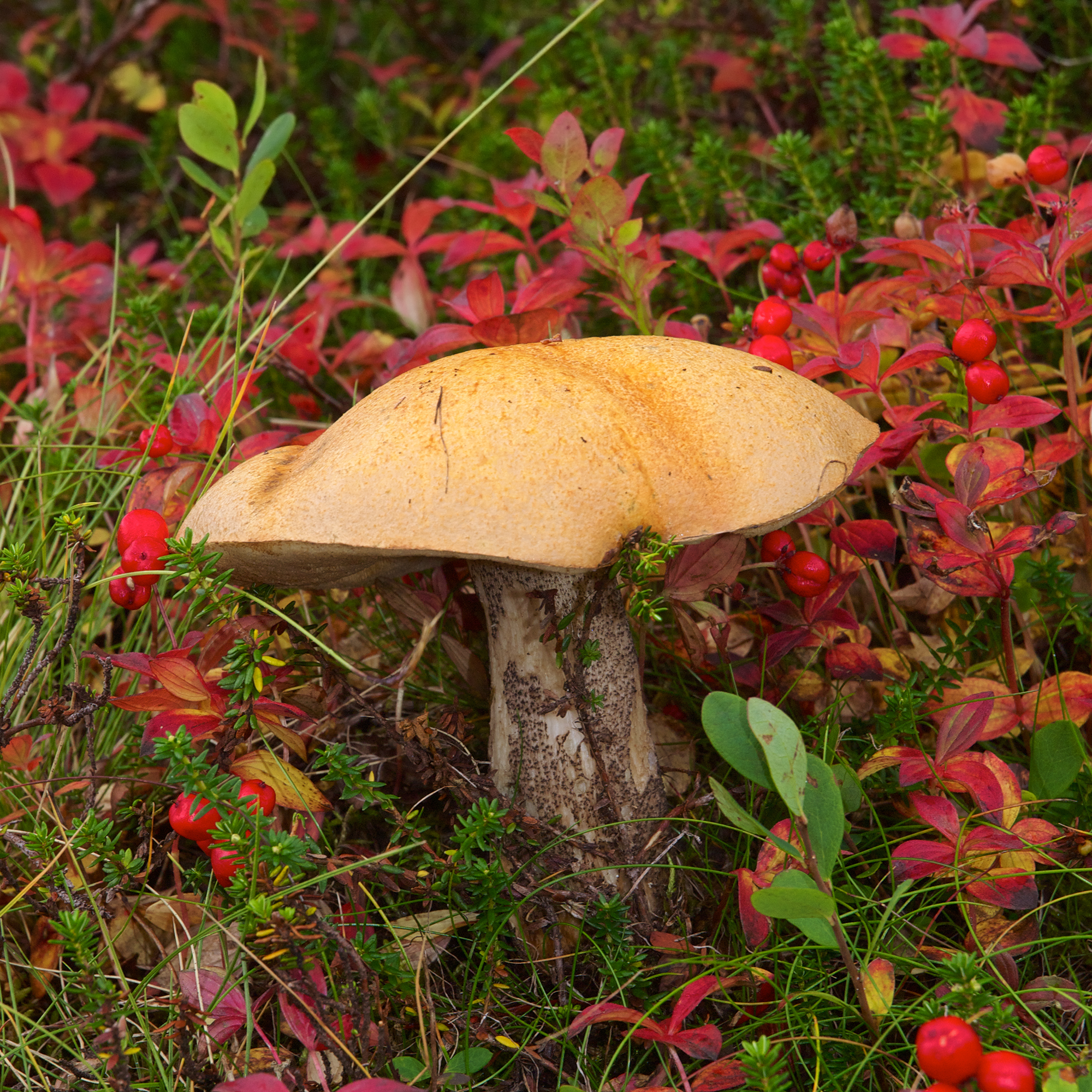

Scientific classification
- Kingdom: Fungi
- Division: Basidiomycota
- Class: Agaricomycetes
- Order: Boletales
- Family: Boletaceae
- Genus: Leccinum
- Species: L. versipelle

Binomial name
- Leccinum versipelle (Fr. & Hök) Snell (1944)

Synonyms
- Boletus versipellis Fr. & Hök (1835); Leccinum atrostipitatum A.H. Sm., Thiers & Watling (1966)

= Leccinum versipelle =

Species of fungus

Leccinum versipelle, also known as Boletus testaceoscaber, dark-stalked bolete, or orange birch bolete, is a common species of mushroom that may be edible when given the right preparation. It is found below birches from July through to November, and turns black when cooked.

== Taxonomy ==
Leccinum is a genus of fungi in the family Boletaceae. It was the name given first to a series of fungi within the genus Boletus, then erected as a new genus last century. Their main distinguishing feature is the small, rigid projections (scabers) that give a rough texture to their stalks. The genus name was coined from the Italian Leccino, for a type of rough-stemmed bolete.

== Description ==
The cap is broadly convex, buff to yellow-orange or ochre, bright red-brown or brick red. It is felty and grows up to 15 centimetres (6 in) in diameter. The flesh is white to pink, when cut staining reddish and then changing to avellaneous and finally fuscous. Tubes are 8 - 22 mm long, yellowish white to brownish grey, violaceous to greyish when bruised. Pores measure 0.5 mm in diameter, greyish white to grey ochre, discolouring brownish when bruised.

The stipe is firm, long and slender, white, lightly to densely covered with fine (sometimes on the stipe base more coarse) greyish to blackish, sometimes whitish, squamules. Stalks are up to 15 cm tall by 3.5 cm wide, whitish, and with many raised, black dots.

The spores are brown, or smokey to blackish-brown, fusiform, (9.0—) 11.5—16.5 x 3.5—4.0(—5.0) μm. Spore print is yellow-brown to olive.

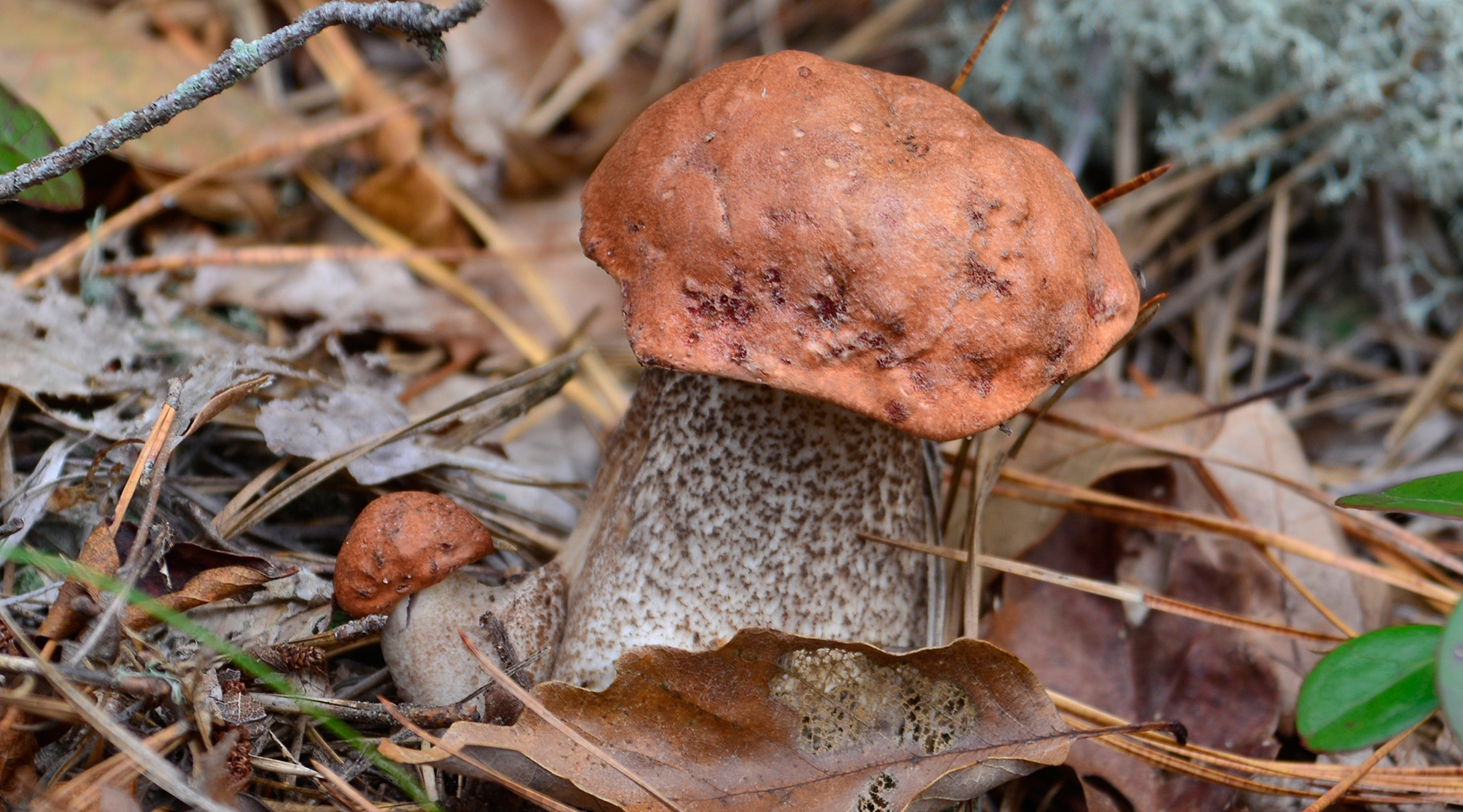
Orange birch bolete (Leccinum versipelle), New Jersey, US

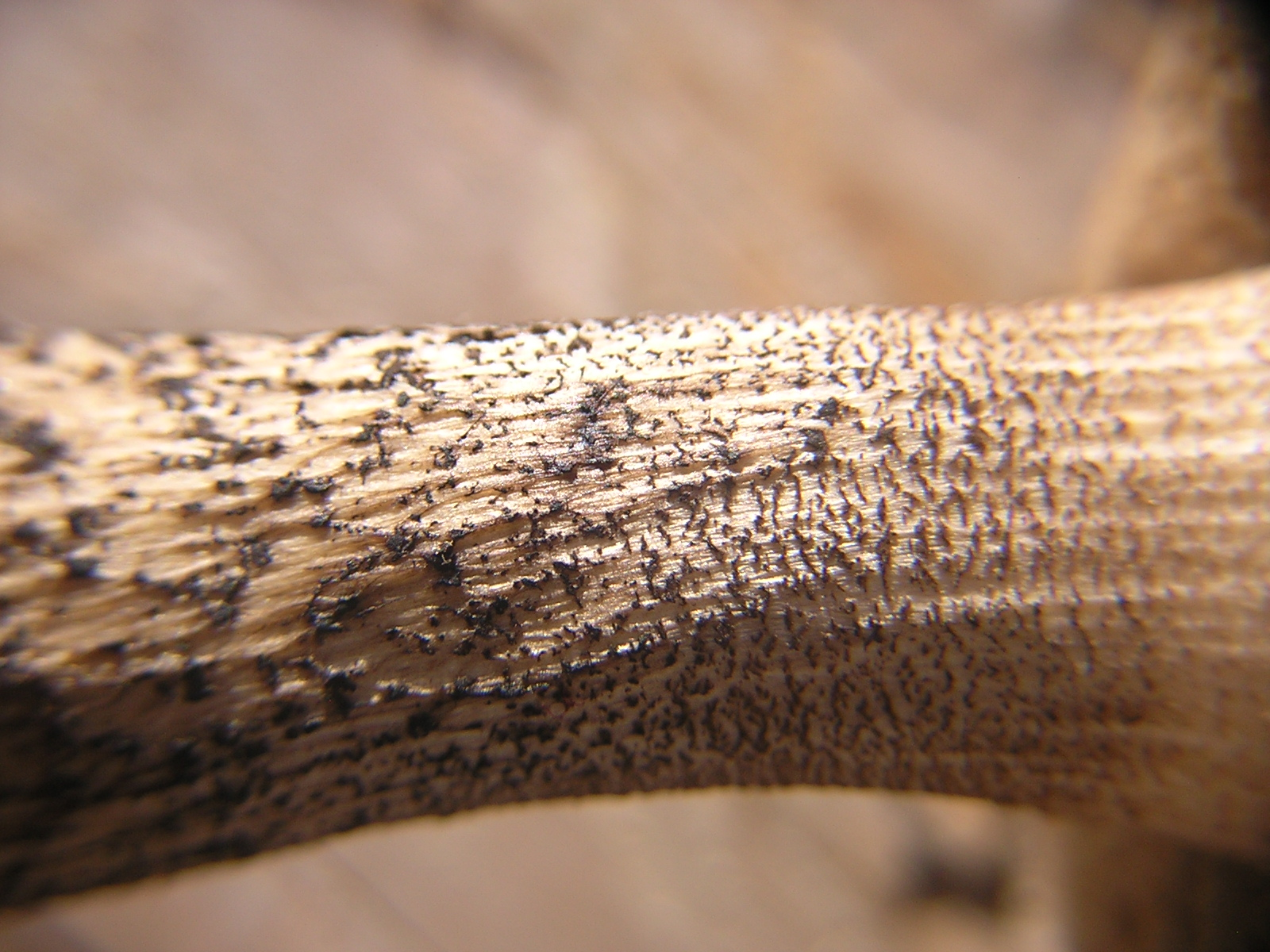
Stem of a Leccinum mushroom, showing the distinctive scabers

== Distribution and habitat ==
Leccinum versipelle fruits on the ground solitary or gregarious, with ectomycorrhizal association with Betula in forests and heathland, on sandy, slightly acidic, loamy soils. It can be found across Europe from August to November.

== Edibility ==
Leccinum versipelle is edible cooked. It is mildly toxic (causing nausea and vomiting) unless given proper heat treatment: frying or boiling for 15–20 minutes is necessary. It is commonly harvested for food in Finland, Latvia, Lithuania, Estonia, Belarus, southeast Alaska and Russia.
