= Shiitake mushroom dermatitis =

Medical condition

- Other names: Flagellate mushroom dermatitis, Mushroom worker's disease, and Shiitake-induced toxicoderma.
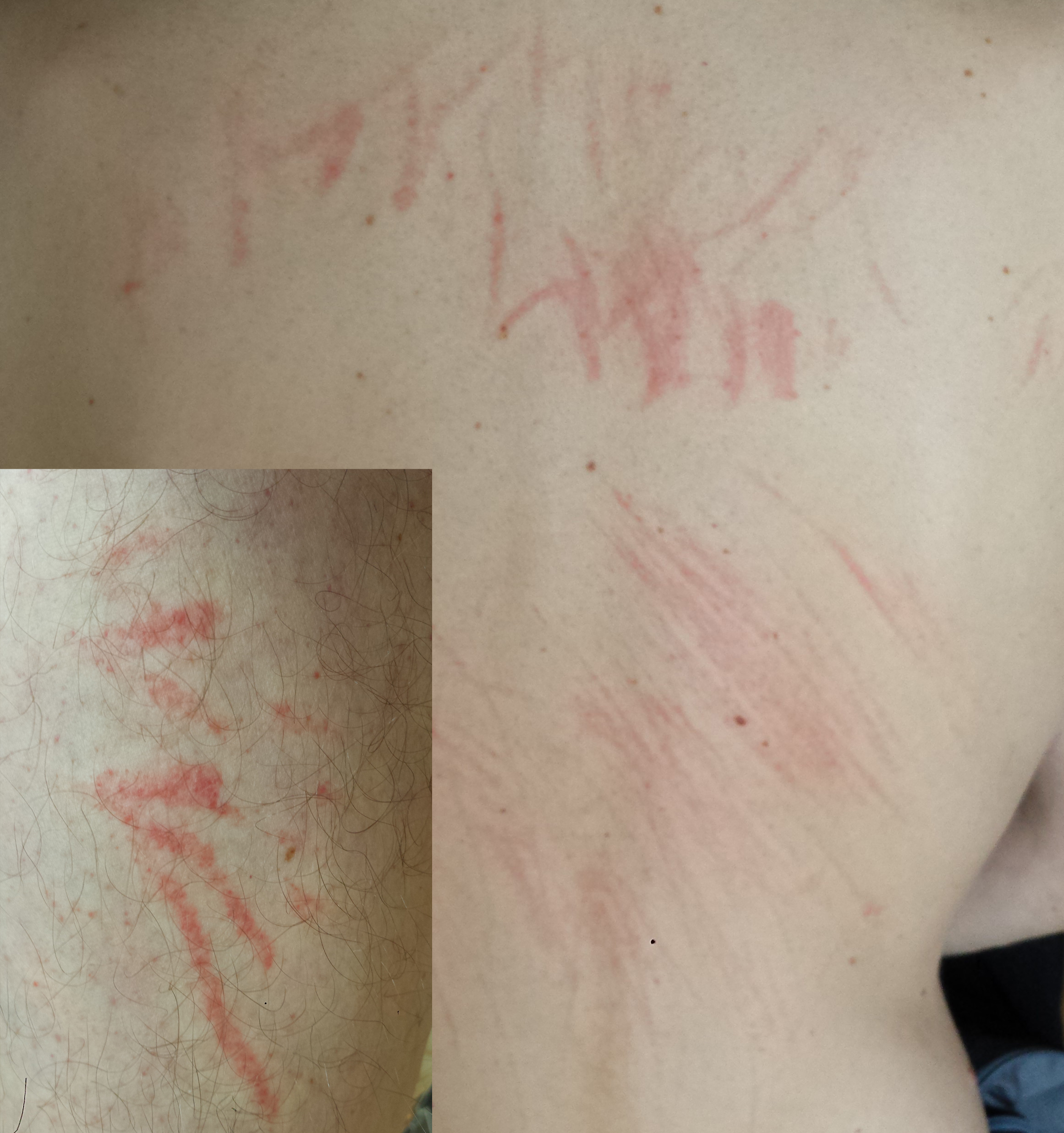
- Symptoms on back and leg. Stripes appear when skin is scratched or spontaneously in friction or contact zones.
- Specialty: Dermatology

Shiitake mushroom dermatitis is an intensely itchy dermatitis characterized by disseminated 1 mm erythematous micropapules seen in a linear grouped arrangement secondary to Koebnerization due to patient scratching. It is caused by the ingestion of shiitake mushrooms and was first described in 1977 by Nakamura. Although it is rarely seen outside China and Japan due to a lower incidence of shiitake consumption outside these regions, there is a well-established association between flagellate dermatitis and shiitake mushroom (Lentinula edodes) ingestion. Bleomycin ingestion may also cause similar findings. On physical exam, one key difference between the two is that post-inflammatory hyperpigmentation changes are usually seen with bleomycin-induced flagellate dermatitis and are not typically present with shiitake mushroom induced flagellate dermatitis. The median time of onset from ingestion of shiitake mushrooms is typically 24 hours, ranging from 12 hours to 5 days. Most patients completely recover by 3 weeks, with or without treatment. Although the pathogenesis of shiitake induced flagellate dermatitis is not clear, the theory most argued for is a toxic reaction to lentinan, a polysaccharide isolated from shiitake mushrooms. However, Type I and Type IV allergic hypersensitivities have also been supported by the 24-hour median time of onset, clearance in 3–21 days, severe pruritus, benefit of steroids and antihistamines, and lack of grouped outbreaks in people exposed to shared meals containing shiitake mushrooms. Most cases reported shortly after its discovery were due to consumption of raw shiitake mushrooms, but several cases have since been reported after consumption of fully cooked mushrooms.

== See also ==
- List of cutaneous conditions
