= Lactarius distantifolius =

Scientific classification
- Kingdom: Fungi
- Division: Basidiomycota
- Class: Agaricomycetes
- Order: Russulales
- Family: Russulaceae
- Genus: Lactarius
- Species: L. distantifolius

Binomial name
- Lactarius distantifolius Van de Putte, Stubbe & Verbeken (2010)

Species of fungus

Lactarius distantifolius is a member of the large milk-cap genus Lactarius in the order Russulales. Found in Chiang Mai Province (northern Thailand), it was described as new to science in 2010. The fruit bodies of the fungus were found growing in a teak plantation (elevation 515 metres (1,690 ft)) with Dipterocarpus obtusifolius and other Dipterocarpus species, Pterocarpus macrocarpus, and Shorea species.

== See also ==
- List of Lactarius species
