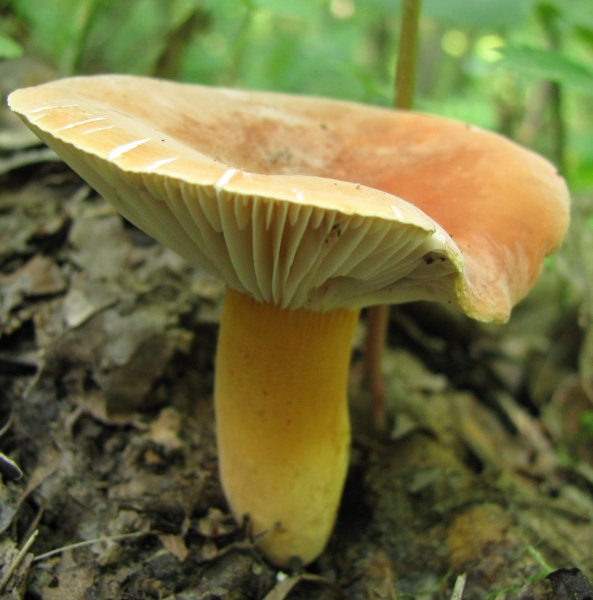

Scientific classification
- Domain: Eukaryota
- Kingdom: Fungi
- Division: Basidiomycota
- Class: Agaricomycetes
- Order: Russulales
- Family: Russulaceae
- Genus: Lactarius
- Species: L. hygrophoroides

Binomial name
- Lactarius hygrophoroides Berk. & M.A.Curtis 1859

Synonyms
- Lactifluus hygrophoroides (Berk. & M.A.Curtis) Kuntze (1891)

= Lactifluus hygrophoroides =

Species of fungus

Lactarius hygrophoroides is an edible North American species of milk-cap mushroom in the order Russulales.

== Taxonomy ==
It was first described scientifically by Miles Joseph Berkeley and Moses Ashley Curtis in 1859.

== Description ==
The cap is initially convex with a depression; the margin lifts with age. The caps are 3–8 centimetres (1 1/4–3 1/4 in) wide and pinkish-orange, frosted by a bloom that darkens when touched. The gills are adnate, sometimes slightly decurrent, and pale. The stem is 2–5 cm (3/4–2 in) long, 7–15 millimetres (1/4–5/8 in) wide, often tapered near the base, and colored like the cap or slightly lighter. The spore print is white.

== Habitat and distribution ==
The species can be found growing under oak trees in eastern North America from June to September.

== Uses ==
It may be a choice edible mushroom, although some report its taste to be mild.
