= List of Lactarius species =

The fungal genus Lactarius comprises about 636 species worldwide. The type species is Lactarius torminosus. Probably the best known and most widely eaten is Lactarius deliciosus. A large number of species were split into the genus Lactifluus based on molecular phylogenetic evidence.

== Key ==
Name	The binomial name of the Lactarius species. "#" indicates a species with a suggested English common name, listed further below.
Author	The author citation—the person who first described the species using an available scientific name, eventually combined with the one who placed it in Lactarius, and using standardized abbreviations.
Year	The year in which the species was named, or transferred to the genus Lactarius.
Classification	First is always the subgenus, then section, then (if the section is further subdivided), the subsection.
Distribution	The distribution of the species.

== Species ==
Species name	Author	Year	Classification	Distribution	Image
Lactarius abbotanus	K.Das & J.R.Sharma	2003	Piperites; Piperites; Scrobiculati	India	
Lactarius abieticola	X.H. Wang	2016			
Lactarius acatlanensis	Bandala, Montoya & A. Ramos	2016			
Lactarius acerrimus	Britzelm.	1893	Piperites; Zonarii; Zonarii	Europe	
Lactarius acris	(Bolton) Gray	1821	Plinthogalus; Plinthogali	Europe	
Lactarius acutus	R.Heim	1955		Guinea, French Guinea	
Lactarius adhaerens	R.Heim	1938		Madagascar	
Lactarius adscitus	Britzelm.	1885			
Lactarius aerugineus	(Lam.) Burl.	1907			
Lactarius aestivus	Nuytinck & Ammirati	2014			
Lactarius affinis#	Peck	1873	Russularia; Triviales	North America	
Lactarius afroscrobiculatus	Verbeken & Van Rooij	2003			
Lactarius agglutinatus	Burl.	1908		North America	
Lactarius akanensis	S. Imai	1935			
Lactarius alachuanus	Murrill	1938		North America	
Lactarius albidigalus	X.H. Wang	2018			
Lactarius albidoarmeniacus	H. Lee, Wisitr. & Y.W. Lim	2019			
Lactarius albidocinereus	X.H. Wang, S.F. Shi & T. Bau	2018			
Lactarius albocarneus	Britzelm.	1895	Piperites; Glutinosi; Pallidini	Europe	
Lactarius albocremeus	Z. Schaef.	1958			
Lactarius albolutescens	Thiers	1957		North America	
Lactarius alboroseus	H. Lee, Wisitr. & Y.W. Lim	2019			
Lactarius alboscrobiculatus	H.T. Le & Verbeken	2007			
Lactarius albus	Velen.	1920			
Lactarius allochrous	Singer	1948		North America	
Lactarius alni	Singer	1962			
Lactarius alnicola#	A.H.Sm.	1960	Piperites; Scrobiculati	North America	
Lactarius alpinihirtipes	X.H. Wang	2017			
Lactarius alpinus	Peck	1875		North America	
Lactarius alutaceus	H. Lee, Wisitr. & Y.W. Lim	2019			
Lactarius amarus	R. Heim	1938			
Lactarius ambiguus	X.H. Wang	2018			
Lactarius angiocarpus	Verbeken & U.Eberhardt	2004	Plinthogali	Zambia	
Lactarius angustifolius	Hesler & A.H.Sm.	1979		North America	
Lactarius angustizonatus	X.H. Wang	2017			
Lactarius annulocystidiatus	S. Sharma, M. Kaur & Atri	2012			
Lactarius aquizonatus	Kytöv.	1984	Piperites; Zonarii; Scrobiculati	Europe	
Lactarius aquosus	H.T. Le & K.D. Hyde	2015			
Lactarius arachnisporus	R. Heim & Perr.-Bertr.	1973			
Lactarius areolatus	Hesler & A.H.Sm.	1979		North America	
Lactarius argillaceifolius#	Hesler & A.H.Sm.	1979	Tristes; Pseudomyxacium		
Lactarius argillascens	A. Pearson ex J. Blum	1966			
Lactarius aroostookensis	Hesler & A.H.Sm.	1979		North America	
Lactarius asiae-orientalis	X.H. Wang	2018			
Lactarius aspideus	(Fr.) Fr.	1838	Piperites; Uvidi; Aspideini	Europe	
Lactarius atlanticus	Bon	1975		Europe	
Lactarius atri	Van de Putte & K. Das	2016			
Lactarius atrobadius	Hesler & A.H.Sm.	1979		North America	
Lactarius atrobrunneus	Wisitr. & K.D. Hyde	2015			
Lactarius atrofuscus	X.H. Wang	2021			
Lactarius atromarginatus	Verbeken & E. Horak	2000			
Lactarius atro-olivaceus	Hesler & A.H.Sm.	1979		North America	
Lactarius atro-olivinus	Verbeken & Walleyn	2000			
Lactarius atrosquamulosus	X. He	1996			
Lactarius atroviolaceus	Montoya & Bandala	2003			
Lactarius atroviridis	Peck	1889		North America	
Lactarius aurantiaco-ochraceus	Lj.N. Vassiljeva	1950			
Lactarius aurantiacopallens	H. Lee, Wisitr. & Y.W. Lim	2019			
Lactarius aurantiacus#	(Pers.) Gray	1821	Russularia; Russularia	Europe	
Lactarius aurantiobrunneus	X.H. Wang	2019			
Lactarius aurantionitidus	Wisitr. & J.Y. Guo	2016			
Lactarius aurantiosordidus	Nuytinck & S.L. Mill	2006		northern California to Alaska	
Lactarius aurantiozonatus	H. Lee, Wisitr. & Y.W. Lim	2019			
Lactarius auriolla	Kytöv.	1984	Piperites; Zonarii; Scrobiculati	Europe	
Lactarius ausablensis	Hesler & A.H.Sm.	1979		North America	
Lactarius austrorostratus	Wisitr. & Verbeken	2015			
Lactarius austroscrobiculatus	Verbeken & E. Horak	2001			
Lactarius austrotabidus	Verbeken & E. Horak	2000			
Lactarius austrotorminosus	H.T. Le & Verbeken	2007			
Lactarius austrozonarius	H.T. Le & Verbeken	2007			
Lactarius avellaneus	S. Imai	1935			
Lactarius azonites	(Bull.) Fr.	1838	Plinthogalus; Plinthogali	Europe	
Lactarius badiopallescens	Hesler & A.H.Sm.	1979		North America	
Lactarius badiosanguineus	Kühner & Romagn.	1954		Europe, North America	
Lactarius badius	Verbeken	1996			
Lactarius baliophaeus	Pegler	1969	Nigrescentes	Africa	
Lactarius barbatus	Verbeken	1996			
Lactarius barrowsii	Hesler & A.H.Sm.	1979	Lactarius	North America	
Lactarius beardsleei	Burl.	1945			
Lactarius beatonii	P.M. Kirk	2015			
Lactarius benghalensis	Paloi & K. Acharya	2018			
Lactarius bensleyae	Burl.	1907			
Lactarius betulinus	H. Lee, Wisitr. & Y.W. Lim	2019			
Lactarius bisporus	Verbeken & F. Hampe	2014			
Lactarius blennius#	(Fr.) Fr.	1838	Piperites; Glutinosi; Pyrogalini	Europe	
Lactarius blumii	Bon	1979			
Lactarius borzianus	(Cavara) Verbeken & Nuytinck	2004			
Lactarius brachycystidiatus	X.H. Wang	2017			
Lactarius brevipes	Longyear	1902			
Lactarius brevis	Peck	1905			
Lactarius brunneoaurantiacus	K. Das & I. Bera	2020			
Lactarius brunneocinnamomeus	Paloi, Verbeken & K. Acharya	2019			
Lactarius brunneohepaticus	M.M. Moser	1978			
Lactarius brunneoviolaceus	M.P.Christ	1941	Piperites; Uvidi; Uvidini	Europe	
Lactarius bryophilus	Peck	1910		North America	
Lactarius bubalinus	Hesler & A.H. Sm.	1979			
Lactarius buckleyanus	Murrill	1943			
Lactarius burkei	A.H. Sm. & Hesler	1962			
Lactarius byssaceus	K. Das & Verbeken	2011			
Lactarius caespitosus	Hesler & A.H.Sm.	1979		North America	
Lactarius californiensis	Hesler & A.H.Sm.	1979		North America	
Lactarius camphoratus#	(Bull.) Fr.	1838	Russularia; Olentes	Europe	
Lactarius capitatus#	K. Das, J.R. Sharma & Montoya	2004			
Lactarius carbonicola	A.H.Sm.	1960		North America	
Lactarius carminascens	Hesler & A.H.Sm.	1979		North America	
Lactarius carnosus	Velen.	1921			
Lactarius carolinensis	Hesler	1960		North America	
Lactarius cascadensis	Hesler & A.H.Sm.	1979		North America	
Lactarius castaneus	W.F. Chiu	1945			
Lactarius castanopsidis	Hongo	1979			
Lactarius caucae	Singer	1973			
Lactarius caulocystidiatus	Verbeken & E. Horak	2001			
Lactarius cavinae	Velen.	1920			
Lactarius changbaiensis	Y. Wang & Z.X. Xie	1984			
Lactarius chelidonium	Peck	1872	Lactarius	North America	
Lactarius chichuensis	W.F. Chiu	1945			
Lactarius chromospermus	Pegler	1982		Africa	
Lactarius chrysophyllus	Z. Schaef.	1957			
Lactarius chrysorrheus#	Fr.	1838	Piperites; Zonarii; Croceini	Europe, North America	
Lactarius ciliatus	H. Lee, Wisitr. & Y.W. Lim	2019			
Lactarius cinereobrunneus	Stubbe & Verbeken	2008	Plinthogali	Malaysia	
Lactarius cinereoroseus	H. Lee, Wisitr. & Y.W. Lim	2019			
Lactarius cinereus	Peck	1872		North America	
Lactarius cinnamomeus	W.F. Chiu	1945			
Lactarius circellatus	Fr.	1838	Piperites; Glutinosi; Pyrogalini	Europe	
Lactarius cistophilus	Bon & Trimbach	1978		Europe	
Lactarius citrinus	H. Lee, Wisitr. & Y.W. Lim	2019			
Lactarius citriolens	Pouzar	1968	Piperites; Zonarii; Scrobiculati	Europe	
Lactarius clelandii	Grgur.	1997		Australia	
Lactarius clethrophilus	Romagn.	1974			
Lactarius clitocybiformis	Murrill	1948			
Lactarius cocosiolens	Methven	1985		North America	
Lactarius cognoscibilis	Beardslee & Burl.	1940		North America	
Lactarius coleopteris	Coker	1918		North America	
Lactarius collybioides	X.H. Wang	2019			
Lactarius colorascens	Peck	1905		North America	
Lactarius condimentus	Verbeken & E. Horak	2000			
Lactarius conglutinatus	X.H. Wang	2018			
Lactarius congolensis	Beeli	1928			
Lactarius constans	J.E. Lange ex Romagn.	1980			
Lactarius controversus	Pers.	1800	Piperites; Zonarii; Zonarii	Europe	
Lactarius cookei	Z. Schaef.	1960			
Lactarius cordovaensis	Hesler & A.H.Sm.	1979		North America	
Lactarius cookei	Z. Schaef.	1960			
Lactarius corrugatus	Verbeken & E. Horak	2000			
Lactarius coryli	Peyronel	1922			
Lactarius costaricensis	Singer	1983			
Lactarius crassiusculus	H.T. Le & D. Stubbe	2007			
Lactarius crassus	(Singer & A.H. Sm.) Pierotti	2015			
Lactarius craterelloides	R. Heim & Gooss.-Font.	1955			
Lactarius cremicolor	H. Lee, Wisitr. & Y.W. Lim	2019			
Lactarius cremor	Fr.	1838			
Lactarius crenulatulus	Wisitr. & Verbeken	2014			
Lactarius crenulatus	K. Das & Verbeken	2012			
Lactarius cretaceus	D. Stubbe & Verbeken	2008			
Lactarius crichtonii	(G.W. Beaton, Pegler & T.W.K. Young) P.M. Kirk	2015			
Lactarius cristulatus	Montoya & Bandala	2003			
Lactarius croceigalus	K. Das & Verbeken	2012			
Lactarius croceus	Burl.	1908		North America	
Lactarius cucurbitoides	H. Lee & Y.W. Lim (2015	2012			
Lactarius cupricolor	Z. Schaef.	1966			
Lactarius cupularoides	Raithelh.	1990			
Lactarius cuspidoaurantiacus	Montoya, Bandala & Garay-Serr.	2014			
Lactarius cyaneocinereus	H. Lee, Wisitr. & Y.W. Lim	2019			
Lactarius cyanopus	Basso	1998			
Lactarius cyanotinctus	Para	2020			
Lactarius cyathula	(Fr.) Fr.	1838			
Lactarius cyathuliformis	Bon	1978	Russularia; Tabidi	Europe	
Lactarius cystidiosus	Thiers	1957			
Lactarius dafianus	K. Das, J.R. Sharma & Verbeken	2003			
Lactarius decipiens	Quél.	1886	Russularia; Russularia	Europe	
Lactarius delicatus	Burl.	1908	Piperites; Piperites; Scrobiculati	North America	
Lactarius deliciosus#	(L.) Gray	1821	Piperites; Deliciosi/Dapetes	Northern hemisphere, Australia	
Lactarius densus	(R. Heim) P.M. Kirk	2015			
Lactarius denudatus	(Calonge & J.M. Vidal) P.M. Kirk	2015			
Lactarius depressus	Hesler & A.H.Sm.	1979		North America	
Lactarius desideratus	Verbeken & Stubbe	2008		Cameroon	
Lactarius desjardinii	(Thiers) P.M. Kirk	2015			
Lactarius deterrimus#	Gröger	1968	Piperites; Deliciosi/Dapetes	Europe	
Lactarius dewevrei	Douanla-Meli	2009		Cameroon	
Lactarius dhakurianus	K. Das, Basso & J.R. Sharma	2005			
Lactarius dilutisalmoneus	X.H. Wang, S.F. Shi & T. Bau	2018			
Lactarius dirkii	P. Uniyal, K. Das, Baghela & R.P. Bhatt	2016			
Lactarius dispersus	Hesler & A.H.Sm.	1979		North America	
Lactarius dolichocaulis	(Pegler) Verbeken & U.Eberhardt	2004	Plinthogali	Zambia	
Lactarius dombangensis	Verbeken & Van de Putte	2016			
Lactarius drassinus	K. Verma, P. Uniyal, Y.P. Sharma & Mehmood	2021			
Lactarius dryadophilus	Kühner	1975	Piperites; Glutinosi; Aspideini	Europe	
Lactarius dunfordii	Hesler & A.H.Sm.	1979		North America	
Lactarius duplicatus	A.H.Sm.	1960	Russularia; Russularia	Europe, North America	
Lactarius eburneus	Thiers	1957		North America	
Lactarius echinellus	Verbeken & Stubbe	2014		Sri Lanka	
Lactarius echinosporus	Z. Schaef.	1960			
Lactarius echinus	Verbeken & Stubbe	2014		Sri Lanka	
Lactarius elaioviscidus	K. Das & Verbeken	2011			
Lactarius ermineus	K. Das & Verbeken	2011			
Lactarius erubescens	Verbeken & E. Horak	2000			
Lactarius eucalypti	O.K.Mill. & R.N. Hilton	1987		Australia	
Lactarius evosmus	Kühner & Romagn.	1954	Piperites; Zonarii; Zonarii	Europe	
Lactarius exilis	X.H. Wang	2019			
Lactarius falcatus	Verbeken&VandePutte	2014		Sri Lanka	
Lactarius fallax#	A.H.Sm. & Hesler	1962	Plinthogalus; Plinthogalus		
Lactarius favrei	H. Jahn	1982)			
Lactarius fennoscandicus	Verbeken & Vesterh.	1998	Piperites; Deliciosi/Dapetes	Europe	
Lactarius ferruginascens	K. Das & Verbeken	2017			
Lactarius ferrugineifolius	Stubbe & Verbeken	2008	Plinthogali	Malaysia	
Lactarius ferrugineus	Pegler	1979			
Lactarius firmus	Pacioni & Lalli	1989			
Lactarius flaviaquosus	X.H. Wang	2019			
Lactarius flavidulus	S. Imai	1935			
Lactarius flavidus	Boud.	1887	Piperites; Uvidi; Aspideini	Europe	
Lactarius flavigalactus	Verbeken & K. Das	2016			
Lactarius flavoaspideus	Kytöv.	2009		Finland	
Lactarius flavofuscus	Herp.	1912			
Lactarius flavopalustris	Kytöv.	2009		Finland	
Lactarius flavorosescens	Stubbe & Verbeken	2008	Plinthogali	Borneo, Malaysia	
Lactarius flexuosus	(Pers.) Gray	1821	Piperites; Glutinosi; Pyrogalini	Europe	
Lactarius flocculosiceps	Burl.	1945			
Lactarius floridanus	Beardslee & Burl.	1940		North America	
Lactarius floridus	H. Lee, Wisitr. & Y.W. Lim	2019			
Lactarius fluens	Boud.	1899	Piperites; Glutinosi; Pyrogalini	Europe	
Lactarius foetidus	Peck	1902			
Lactarius formosus	H.T. Le & Verbeken	2007			
Lactarius fraxineus	Romagn.	1964			
Lactarius friabilis	H.T. Le & D. Stubbe	2007			
Lactarius frustratus	Hesler & A.H.Sm.	1979		North America	
Lactarius fulgens	R. Heim	1938			
Lactarius fuliginellus	A.H.Sm. & Hesler	1962		North America	
Lactarius fuliginosus#	(Krapf) Fr.	1838	Plinthogalus; Plinthogali	Europe	
Lactarius fulvescens	H. Lee, Wisitr. & Y.W. Lim	2019			
Lactarius fulvihirtipes	X.H. Wang	2018			
Lactarius fulvissimus#	Romagn.	1954	Russularia; Russularia	Europe	
Lactarius fulvus	Stubbe & Verbeken	2008	Plinthogali	Malaysia	
Lactarius fumeacolor	Burl.	1945		North America	
Lactarius fumosibrunneus	A.H. Sm. & Hesler	1962			
Lactarius fumosus#	Peck	1872	Plinthogalus; Fumosi	North America	
Lactarius furfuraceus	X.H. Wang	2018			
Lactarius fuscomaculatus	Wisitr. & Verbeken	2015			
Lactarius fusco-olivaceus	Hesler & A.H.Sm.	1979		North America	
Lactarius fuscozonarius	H. Lee, Wisitr. & Y.W. Lim	2019			
Lactarius gardneri	(Zeller & C.W. Dodge) Pierotti	2015			
Lactarius gerardii	Peck	1873			
Lactarius giennensis	(Mor.-Arr., J. Gómez & Calonge) Pierotti	2015			
Lactarius gigasporus	Singer	1983			
Lactarius glabrigracilis	Wisitr. & Nuytinck	2014			
Lactarius glabripes	A.H. Sm.	1933			
Lactarius glutigriseus	V.L. Wells & Kempton	1974		North America	
Lactarius glutininitens	Har. Takah.	2001			
Lactarius glutinosus	Sumst.	1941		North America	
Lactarius glyciosmus#	(Fr.) Fr.	1838	Piperites; Colorati; Coloratini	Europe, North America	
Lactarius gossypinus	Hesler & A.H.Sm.	1979		North America	
Lactarius gracilentus	A.H. Sm. & Hesler	1962			
Lactarius gracilis	Hongo	1957			
Lactarius grammoloma	E.H.L. Krause	1928			
Lactarius grandisporus	Lj.N. Vassiljeva	1950			
Lactarius griseogalus	R. Heim	1967			
Lactarius griseus	Peck	1873		North America	
Lactarius groenlandicus	Terk.	1956			
Lactarius guanacastensis	Singer	1983			
Lactarius guangdongensis	X.H. Wang, Y. Han & C.Z. Liang	2019			
Lactarius guttisporus	Verbeken & E. Horak	2000			
Lactarius hatsudake	Nobuj. Tanaka	1890		Asia	
Lactarius haugiae	Bandala, Montoya & A. Ramos	2016			
Lactarius helodes	A. Favre & Guichard	2002			
Lactarius helvus#	(Fr.) Fr.	1838	Piperites; Colorati; Coloratini	Europe, North America	
Lactarius hengduanensis	X.H. Wang	2016			
Lactarius hepaticus#	Plowr.	1905	Russularia; Russularia	Europe, North America	
Lactarius herrerae	Montoya, Bandala & Garay-Serr.	2014			
Lactarius hibbardae	Peck	1908		North America	
Lactarius highlandensis	Hesler & A.H.Sm.	1979		North America	
Lactarius himalayanus	Rawla & Sarwal	1983			
Lactarius hirtipes	J.Z. Ying	1991			
Lactarius hispidulus	R. Heim	1955			
Lactarius horakii	Nuytinck & Verbeken	2006	Gerardii	Indonesia	
Lactarius hortensis	Velen.	1920			
Lactarius hradecensis	Z. Schaef.	1948			
Lactarius hrdovensis	Škubla	2006			
Lactarius hygrophoroides	Berk. & M.A. Curtis	1859		North America	
Lactarius hyphoinflatus	R.W. Rayner	2003			
Lactarius hysginoides	Korhonen & T. Ulvinen	1985	Piperites; Glutinosi; Trivialini	Europe	
Lactarius hysginus	(Fr.) Fr.	1838	Piperites; Glutinosi; Pallidini	Europe, North America	
Lactarius ilicis	Sarnari	1993			
Lactarius illyricus	Piltaver	1992		Slovenia	
Lactarius imbricatus	M.X.Zhou & H.A.Wen	2008		Tibet	
Lactarius imperceptus	Beardslee & Burl.	1940		North America	
Lactarius inamyloideus	Verbeken & E. Horak	2000			
Lactarius incarnatozonatus	Hesler & A.H.Sm.	1979		North America	
Lactarius incarnatus	H. Lee, Wisitr. & Y.W. Lim	2019			
Lactarius inconspicuus	H.T. Le & F. Hampe	2015			
Lactarius incrustatus	X.H. Wang	2019			
Lactarius indigo#	(Schwein.) Fr.	1838	Lactarius	North America, Asia, Central America	
Lactarius indoaquosus	K. Das & Verbeken	2017			
Lactarius indochrysorrheus	K. Das & Verbeken	2015			
Lactarius indoscrobiculatus	K. Das & I. Bera	2020			
Lactarius indozonarius	Uniyal, K. Das & Nuytinck	2018			
Lactarius inquinatus	H. Lee, Wisitr. & Y.W. Lim	2019			
Lactarius intonsus	Verbeken & E. Horak	2000			
Lactarius irregularis	A. Blytt	1905			
Lactarius isabellinus	Burl.	1907			
Lactarius javanicus	Verbeken & E. Horak	2001			
Lactarius jecorinus	(Fr.) Fr.	1838			
Lactarius josserandii	(Malençon) J.M. Vidal & P. Alvarado	2019			
Lactarius kabansus	Pegler & Piearce	1980		Zambia	
Lactarius kalospermus	(Beeli) Verbeken & Walleyn	1996			
Lactarius kauffmanii	Hesler & A.H.Sm.	1979		North America	
Lactarius keralensis	V.A. Farook & Manim.	2016			
Lactarius kesiyae	Verbeken & K.D. Hyde	20195			
Lactarius kuehneri	Joss.	1952			
Lactarius kumaonensis	Uniyal, K. Das, R.P. Bhatt & U. Singh	2017			
Lactarius laccarioides	Wisitr. & Verbeken	2014			
Lactarius lachungensis	Verbeken & Van de Putte	2016			
Lactarius lactarioides	(Zeller) P.M. Kirk	2015			
Lactarius lacteolutescens	Montoya, Bandala & G. Moreno	1998			
Lactarius lacteovirescens	Verbeken & E. Horak	2000			
Lactarius lacunarum	(Romagn.) ex Hora	1960	Russularia; Russularia	Europe	
Lactarius lanceolatus	O.K.Mill. & Laursen	1973	Russularia; Russularia	Europe, North America	
Lactarius lanuginosus	Burl.	1908		North America	
Lactarius lapponicus	Harmaja	1976			
Lactarius laricinus	Singer	1989			
Lactarius lazulinus	D. Stubbe, Verbeken & Watling	2007			
Lactarius lentus	Coker	1918		North America	
Lactarius leonis	Kytöv.	1984	Piperites; Zonarii; Scrobiculati	Europe	
Lactarius lepidotus	Hesler & A.H.Sm.	1979		Europe, North America	
Lactarius lignicola	W.F. Chiu	1945			
Lactarius lignyotellus	A.H.Sm. & Hesler	1962		North America	
Lactarius lignyotus	Fr.	1855	Plinthogalus; Plinthogali	Europe, North America	
Lactarius lilacinus	(Lasch) Fr.	1838	Piperites; Colorati; Coloratini	Europe	
Lactarius liliputianus	Verbeken & E. Horak	2000			
Lactarius limacinus	Beardslee & Burl.	1940		North America	
Lactarius limacium	Velen.	1920			
Lactarius listeri	Krombh. ex Sacc.	1915			
Lactarius lividorubescens	(Batsch) Burl.	1908			
Lactarius louisii	Homola	1976		North America	
Lactarius luculentus	Burl.	1936		North America	
Lactarius luridus	(Pers.) Gray	1821	Piperites; Uvidi; Uvidini	Europe	
Lactarius luteocanus	Hesler & A.H.Sm.	1979		North America	
Lactarius lutescens	H. Lee, Wisitr. & Y.W. Lim	2019			
Lactarius luteus	A. Blytt	1905			
Lactarius mackinawensis	Hesler & A.H.Sm.	1979		North America	
Lactarius maculatipes	Burl.	1942		North America	
Lactarius maculatus	Peck	1888		North America	
Lactarius maculosus	Murrill	1916		North America	
Lactarius mairei	Malençon	1939	Piperites; Piperites	Europe	
Lactarius maitlyensis	K. Das, J.R. Sharma & Verbeken	2003			
Lactarius maliodorus	Boud.	1900			
Lactarius mammosus	Fr.	1838	Piperites; Colorati; Coloratini	Europe	
Lactarius manzanitae	Methven	1985		North America	
Lactarius marasmioides	X.H. Wang	2018			
Lactarius marci-panis	Velen.	1920			
Lactarius maruiaensis	McNabb	1971			
Lactarius marylandicus	A.H. Sm. & Hesler	1962			
Lactarius mayawatianus	K. Das & J.R. Sharma	2003			
Lactarius mea	Grgur.	1997		Australia	
Lactarius mediterraneensis	Llistos. & Bellù	1996			
Lactarius megalopterus	Beenken & Sainge	2016			
Lactarius melanodermus	R. Heim & Gooss.-Font.	1955			
Lactarius melanogalus	R. Heim	1955			
Lactarius mexicanus	A. Kong & Estrada	1994			
Lactarius microbuccinatus	H. Lee, Wisitr. & Y.W. Lim	2019			
Lactarius microsporus	Sosin	1960			
Lactarius midlandensis	Hesler & A.H.Sm.	1979		North America	
Lactarius miniatescens	Verbeken & Van Rooij	2003			
Lactarius miniatosporus	Montoya & Bandala	2004			
Lactarius minimus	W.G. Sm.	1873			
Lactarius minusculus	Burl.	1907		North America	
Lactarius mirabilis	D. Stubbe, Verbeken & Watling	2007		Europe, North America	
Lactarius mirus	X.H. Wang, W.Q. Qin, Z.H. Chen, W.Q. Deng & Zhen Wang	2021			
Lactarius mitratus	H. Lee, Wisitr. & Y.W. Lim	2019			
Lactarius montanus	(Hesler & A.H.Sm.) Montoya & Bandala	2003			
Lactarius montoyae	K. Das & J.R. Sharma	2004			
Lactarius moravicus	Z. Schaef.	1979			
Lactarius moschatus	Hesler & A.H.Sm.	1979		North America	
Lactarius moseri	Harmaja	1985			
Lactarius mucidus	Burl.	1908		North America	
Lactarius mukteswaricus	K. Das, J.R. Sharma & Montoya	2004			
Lactarius muscicola	Hesler & A.H.Sm.	1979		North America	
Lactarius muscosus	Velen.	1920			
Lactarius musteus#	Fr.	1838	Piperites; Glutinosi; Pallidini	Europe	
Lactarius mutabilis	Peck	1890		North America	
Lactarius nancyae	Hesler & A.H. Sm.	1979			
Lactarius nanus	J.Favre	1955	Piperites; Glutinosi; Trivialini	Europe	
Lactarius necator	(Bull.) Pers.	1800			
Lactarius neglectus	X.H. Wang	2018			
Lactarius neotabidus	A.H.Sm.	1983		North America	
Lactarius neuhoffii	Hesler & A.H.Sm.	1979		North America	
Lactarius nigricans	G.S. Wang & L.H. Qiu	2018			
Lactarius nigroviolascens	G.F. Atk.	1918			
Lactarius nimkeae	Hesler & A.H.Sm.	1979		North America	
Lactarius nitidus	Burl.	1907			
Lactarius nodulisporus	Uniyal, K. Das & R.P. Bhatt	2018			
Lactarius nonlactifluus	Murrill	1938			
Lactarius novae-zelandiae	McNabb	1971			
Lactarius nudus	R. Heim	1955			
Lactarius obnubiloides	Thiers	1957			
Lactarius obscuratus#	Romagn.	1974	Russularia; Tabidi	Europe, North America	
Lactarius occidentalis	A.H.Sm.	1960		North America	
Lactarius odoratus	Velen.	1920			
Lactarius oedohyphosus	Idzerda & Noordel.	1997			
Lactarius ogasawarashimensis	S. Ito & S. Imai	1940			
Lactarius olivaceobrunneus	Hesler & A.H. Sm.	1979		North America	
Lactarius olivaceofuscus	X.H. Wang	2021			
Lactarius olivaceoglutinus	K. Das & Verbeken	2015			
Lactarius olivaceopallidus	P. Uniyal	2019			
Lactarius olivaceorimosellus	X.H. Wang, S.F. Shi & T. Bau	2018			
Lactarius olivaceoumbrinus	Hesler & A.H.Sm.	1979		North America, India	
Lactarius olivinus	Kytöv.	1984	Piperites; Zonarii; Scrobiculati	Europe	
Lactarius olympianus	Hesler & A.H.Sm.	1979		North America	
Lactarius omeiensis	W.F. Chiu	1945			
Lactarius omphaliiformis	Romagn.	1974	Russularia; Tabidi	Europe, South America	
Lactarius oomsisiensis	Verbeken & Halling	2002			
Lactarius orientaliquietus	X.H. Wang	2018			
Lactarius orientalis	(Verbeken) Verbeken	2000			
Lactarius orientitorminosus	H. Lee, Wisitr. & Y.W. Lim	2019			
Lactarius pallescens	Hesler & A.H.Sm.	1979	Tristes; Violaceo-Maculati	North America	
Lactarius pallidiolivaceus	Hesler & A.H.Sm.	1979		North America	
Lactarius pallidior	Stubbe & Verbeken	2008	Plinthogali	Malaysia	
Lactarius pallidizonatus	X.H. Wang	2017			
Lactarius pallidomarginatus	Barge & C.L.Cripps	2016		North America	
Lactarius pallido-ochraceus	X.H. Wang	2017			
Lactarius pallidozonarius	G.J. Li & W.F. Lin	2021			
Lactarius pallidus#	Pers.	1797	Piperites; Glutinosi; Pallidini	Europe	
Lactarius paludinellus	Peck	1885		North America	
Lactarius pandani	R. Heim	1938			
Lactarius papillatus	Stubbe & Verbeken	2008	Plinthogali	Malaysia	
Lactarius paradoxus	Beardslee & Burl.	1940	Lactarius	North America	
Lactarius parallelus	H. Lee, Wisitr. & Y.W. Lim	2019			
Lactarius parvulus	Murrill	1940		North America	
Lactarius pasohensis	Wisitr. & D. Stubbe	2014			
Lactarius paucifluus	Murrill	1948			
Lactarius paulus	P.M. Kirk	2015			
Lactarius payettensis	A.H.Sm.	1960		North America	
Lactarius peckii	Burl.	1908		North America	
Lactarius pectinatus	H. Lee, Wisitr. & Y.W. Lim	2019			
Lactarius pellicularis	R. Heim	1955			
Lactarius pellucidus	Gooss.-Font. & R. Heim	1955			
Lactarius pennulatus	Verbeken & E. Horak	2000			
Lactarius perconicus	Verbeken & E. Horak	2000			
Lactarius perparvus	Wisitr. & F. Hampe	2014			
Lactarius pervelutinus	Hesler & A.H.Sm.	1979		North America	
Lactarius picinus	Fr.	1838	Plinthogalus; Plinthogali	Europe	
Lactarius pilatii	Z.Schaef.	1968	Piperites; Glutinosi; Pyrogalini	Europe	
Lactarius pinastri	Romagn.	1980			
Lactarius pinckneyensis	Hesler & A.H.Sm.	1979		North America	
Lactarius pinicola	Smotl. ex Z. Schaef.	1970			
Lactarius piniolens	Epinat & Kizlik	1997			
Lactarius planus	Umemura	1923			
Lactarius pleuromacrocystidiatus	Uniyal, K. Das & R.P. Bhatt	2019			
Lactarius plinthogalus	(J. Otto) Burl.	1908			
Lactarius plumbeus	(Bull.) Gray	1821			
Lactarius pohangensis	H. Lee, Wisitr. & Y.W. Lim	2019			
Lactarius politus	Wisitr. & K.D. Hyde	2015			
Lactarius pomiolens	Verbeken & Stubbe	2014		Sri Lanka	
Lactarius populicola	J.M. Vidal, Konstantin., Setkos & Slavova	2019			
Lactarius porniniae	Rolland	1889	Piperites; Zonarii; Zonarii	Europe	
Lactarius praegnantissimus	(Paulet) Bataille	1908			
Lactarius praeserifluus	Murrill	1938			
Lactarius praeviscidus	Murrill	1943			
Lactarius praezonatus	Murrill	1943		North America	
Lactarius proximellus	Beardslee & Burl.	1940		North America	
Lactarius psammicola	A.H.Sm.	1941		North America	
Lactarius pseudoaffinis	Hesler & A.H.Sm.	1979		North America	
Lactarius pseudoaspideus	Hesler & A.H.Sm.	1979		North America	
Lactarius pseudodeceptivus	Hesler & A.H.Sm.	1979		North America	
Lactarius pseudodelicatus	A.H.Sm.	1960		North America	
Lactarius pseudodeliciosus	Beardslee & Burl.	1940		North America	
Lactarius pseudofallax	A.H. Sm. & Hesler	1962			
Lactarius pseudoflexuosus	Hesler & A.H.Sm.	1979		North America	
Lactarius pseudofragilis	X.H. Wang	2017			
Lactarius pseudofuliginosus	A.H. Sm. & Hesler	1962			
Lactarius pseudogerardii	Hesler & A.H.Sm.	1979		North America	
Lactarius pseudohatsudake	X.H. Wang	2016			
Lactarius pseudolignyotus	R. Heim	1955			
Lactarius pseudomaculatus	Hesler & A.H.Sm.	1979		North America	
Lactarius pseudomucidus	Hesler & A.H.Sm.	1979		North America	
Lactarius pseudoscrobiculatus	Basso, Neville & Poumarat	2001			
Lactarius pseudouvidus	Kühner	1975	Piperites; Uvidi; Uvidini	Europe	
Lactarius pterosporus	Romagn.	1949	Plinthogalus; Plinthogali	Europe	
Lactarius pubescens#	Fr.	1838	Piperites; Piperites	Europe, North America	
Lactarius pudorinus	Verbeken & Bougher	2002			
Lactarius pulchrispermus	Verbeken	1996			
Lactarius pungens	Hesler & A.H.Sm.	1979		North America	
Lactarius puniceus	H. Lee, Wisitr. & Y.W. Lim	2019			
Lactarius purgatorii	Singer	1948			
Lactarius purpureobadius	Malençon ex Basso	2009		Morocco	
Lactarius purpureocastaneus	X.H. Wang	2017			
Lactarius purpureoechinatus	Hesler & A.H.Sm.	1979		North America	
Lactarius purpureus	R. Heim	1966			
Lactarius pusillisporus	Verbeken	1996			
Lactarius pusillus	Bres.	1929			
Lactarius pyriodorus	K. Das & Verbeken	2015			
Lactarius pyrogalus#	(Bull.) Fr.	1838	Piperites; Glutinosi; Pyrogalini	Europe, North America	
Lactarius qinlingensis	X.H. Wang	2018			
Lactarius quercuum	Singer	1963		Bolivia	
Lactarius quieticolor	Romagn.	1958	Piperites; Deliciosi/Dapetes	Europe	
Lactarius quietus#	(Fr.) Fr.	1838	Russularia; Russularia	Europe, North America	
Lactarius rajmahalensis	Hembrom, K. Das & A. Parihar	2017			
Lactarius repraesentaneus#	Britzelm.	1885	Piperites; Uvidi; Aspideini	Europe, North America	
Lactarius resimus	(Fr.) Fr.	1838	Piperites; Zonarii; Scrobiculati	Europe, North America	
Lactarius resinosus	X.H. Wang	2019			
Lactarius reticulatus	(Berk.) Singer	1955			
Lactarius reticulisporus	H. Lee, Wisitr. & Y.W. Lim	2019			
Lactarius rimosellus	Peck	1906		North America	
Lactarius riparius	Methven	1985		North America	
Lactarius robertianus	Bon	1985			
Lactarius romagnesii	Bon	1979	Plinthogalus; Plinthogali	Europe	
Lactarius roseoligalus	X.H. Wang	2019			
Lactarius roseoviolascens	(Lasch) Romell	1924			
Lactarius rostratus	Heilm.-Claus.	1998	Russularia; Olentes	Europe	
Lactarius rubidus#	(Hesler & A.H.Sm.) Methven	1997		North America	
Lactarius rubrilacteus#	Hesler & A.H.Sm.	1979	Lactarius	North America	
Lactarius rubriviridis	Desjardin, Saylor & Thiers	2003	Dapetes	USA	
Lactarius rubrobrunneus	H.T. Le & Nuytinck	2015			
Lactarius rubrocinctus	Fr.	1863	Russularia; Tabidi	Europe	
Lactarius rubrocorrugatus	Wisitr. & Nuytinck	2015	Russularia; Tabidi	Europe	
Lactarius rubrozonatus	Lalli & Pacioni	2003			
Lactarius rufulus#	Peck	1907	Russularia; Thejogali	North America	
Lactarius rufus#	(Scop.) Fr.	1838	Piperites; Colorati; Rufini	Europe, North America	
Lactarius ruginosus	Romagn.	1957	Plinthogalus; Plinthogali	Europe, North America	
Lactarius rugosus	Velen.	1920			
Lactarius rumongensis	Verbeken	1996			
Lactarius russuliformis	(Beeli) Verbeken	1996			
Lactarius rusticanus	(Scop.) Burl.	1908			
Lactarius sakamotoi	S. Imai	1935			
Lactarius salicis-herbaceae	Kühner	1975	Piperites; Uvidi; Aspideini	Europe	
Lactarius salicis-reticulatae	Kühner	1975	Piperites; Uvidi; Aspideini	Europe, America	
Lactarius salmoneus	Peck	1898	Lactarius	North America	
Lactarius salmonicolor	R.Heim & Leclair	1953	Lactarius	Europe, North America	
Lactarius sanguifluus	(Paulet) Fr.	1838	Piperites; Deliciosi/Dapetes	Europe	
Lactarius sanguineovirescens	Fillion	1989			
Lactarius sanjappae	K. Das, J.R. Sharma & Montoya	2004			
Lactarius sanmiguelensis	Hesler & A.H.Sm.	1979		North America	
Lactarius saponaceus	Verbeken	1996			
Lactarius sarthalanus	K. Verma, P. Uniyal, Y.P. Sharma & Mehmood	2021			
Lactarius saturnisporus	Verbeken & Stubbe	2014		Sri Lanka	
Lactarius saylorii	(Thiers) P.M. Kirk	2015			
Lactarius sciaphilus	Verbeken & C. Sharp	2003			
Lactarius scoticus	Berk. & Broome	1879	Piperites; Piperites	Europe	
Lactarius scrobiculatus	(Scop.) Fr.	1838	Piperites; Zonarii; Scrobiculati	Europe, North America	
Lactarius semisanguifluus	R.Heim & Leclair	1950	Piperites; Deliciosi/Dapetes	Europe	
Lactarius serifluus#	(DC.) Fr.	1838	Russularia; Olentes	Europe	
Lactarius shiwalikensis	J. Kumar & N.S. Atri	2021			
Lactarius shoreae	Stubbe & Verbeken	2014		Sri Lanka	
Lactarius siccus	Velen.	1920			
Lactarius sikkimensis	Verbeken & K. Das	2016			
Lactarius silviae	Pierotti	2015			
Lactarius similis	Hesler & A.H.Sm.	1979		North America	
Lactarius similissimus	A.H. Sm. & Hesler	1962			
Lactarius singeri	Uniyal, K. Das & R.P. Bhatt	2018			
Lactarius sinozonarius	X.H. Wang	2017			
Lactarius smithii	Montoya & Bandala	2004			
Lactarius soehneri	(Zeller & C.W. Dodge) J.M. Vidal & G. Moreno	2019			
Lactarius southworthiae	J.L. Frank	2014		North America	
Lactarius spadiceus	H. Lee, Wisitr. & Y.W. Lim	2019			
Lactarius sphagneti	(Fr.) Neuhoff	1956	Russularia; Russularia	Europe	
Lactarius spinosporus	X.Y. Sang & L. Fan	2016			
Lactarius spinosulus#	Quél.	1880	Piperites; Piperites	Europe	
Lactarius splendens	Hesler & A.H.Sm.	1979		North America	
Lactarius squamulosus	Z.S. Bi & T.H. Li	1987			
Lactarius steffenii	Rick	1930			
Lactarius stephensii	(Berk.) Verbeken & Walleyn	2004			
Lactarius striatus	R. Heim	1938			
Lactarius strigosipes	Montoya & Bandala	2008			
Lactarius strigosus	Verbeken & E. Horak	2000			
Lactarius stubbei	Wisitr. & Verbeken	2014			
Lactarius subalpinus	A. Blytt	1905			
Lactarius subamarus	Verbeken	1996			
Lactarius subatlanticus	X.H. Wang	2018			
Lactarius subaustralis	Hesler	1960			
Lactarius subbaliophaeus	Maba & Yorou	2014	Nigrescentes	Togo, Africa	
Lactarius subborealis	A.H. Sm. & Hesler	1962			
Lactarius subbrevipes	X.H. Wang	2017			
Lactarius subcircellatus	Kühner	1975	Piperites; Glutinosi; Trivialini	Europe	
Lactarius subdulcis#	(Pers.) Gray	1821	Russularia; Russularia	Europe	
Lactarius subflammeus#	Hesler & A.H.Sm.	1979	Russularia; Russularia	North America	
Lactarius subgiennensis	Loizides, J.M. Vidal & P. Alvarado	2019			
Lactarius subgracilis	X.H. Wang	2018			
Lactarius subhirtipes	X.H. Wang	2018			
Lactarius subindigo	Verbeken & E. Horak	2000		India, China, Papua New Guinea, Japan?	
Lactarius subisabellinus	Murrill	1948		North America	
Lactarius sublaccarioides	Wisitr. & Verbeken	2014			
Lactarius sublacustris	Hesler & A.H.Sm.	1979		North America	
Lactarius sublatus	(Murrill) Murrill	1944			
Lactarius subolivaceus	Hesler & A.H.Sm.	1979		North America	
Lactarius subomphaliformis	H. Lee, Wisitr. & Y.W. Lim	2019			
Lactarius subpaludosus	Hesler & A.H.Sm.	1979		North America	
Lactarius subpalustris	Hesler & A.H.Sm.	1979		North America	
Lactarius subplinthogalus	Coker	1918		North America	
Lactarius subpurpureus	Peck	1878	Lactarius	North America	
Lactarius subresimus	O.K. Mill.	1982			
Lactarius subruginosus	J. Blum ex Bon	1985			
Lactarius subserifluus	Longyear	1902		North America	
Lactarius substriatus	A.H.Sm.	1960		North America	
Lactarius subtestaceus	Muriill	1939		North America	
Lactarius subtorminosus	Coker	1918		North America	
Lactarius subumbonatus	Lindgr.	1845	Russularia; Olentes	Europe	
Lactarius subumbrinus	Hesler & A.H.Sm.	1979		North America	
Lactarius subvelutinus	Peck	1904		North America	
Lactarius subvernalis	Hesler & A.H.Sm.	1960		North America	
Lactarius subvillosus	Hesler & A.H.Sm.	1979			
Lactarius subviscidus	Hesler & A.H.Sm.	1979		North America	
Lactarius subzonarius	Hongo	1957			
Lactarius sulcatulus	Verbeken	1996			
Lactarius sulcatus	Verbeken & Walleyn	2000			
Lactarius sulphosmus	G.J. Li & R.L. Zhao	2018			
Lactarius sulphurescens	Verbeken & E. Horak	2001			
Lactarius sumstinei	Peck	1905		North America	
Lactarius syringinus	Z.Schaef.	1956	Piperites; Glutinosi; Pyrogalini	Europe	
Lactarius tabidus#	Fr.	1838	Russularia; Tabidi	Europe	
Lactarius taedae	Silva-Filho, Sulzbacher & Wartchow	2018			
Lactarius tangerinus	H.T. Le & De Crop	2015			
Lactarius tatrorum	Z. Schaef.	1958			
Lactarius tawai	McNabb	1971			
Lactarius telinolens	(Bellardi) Sacc. & Trotter	1912			
Lactarius tenellus	Verbeken & Walleyn	2000			
Lactarius tephropeplis	Hesler & A.H.Sm.	1979		North America	
Lactarius terenopus	Romagn.	1957			
Lactarius tesquorum	Malençon	1979		Morocco, Mediterranean Europe	
Lactarius texensis	(A.H.Sm. & Hesler) Hesler & A.H.Sm.	1979		North America	
Lactarius textus	(J.W. Cribb) P.M. Kirk	2015			
Lactarius thakalorum	Bills & Cotter	1989			
Lactarius theissenii	Murr	1918			
Lactarius thiersii	Hesler & A.H.Sm.	1979		North America	
Lactarius thindii	P. Uniyal, K. Das & Nuytinck	2018			
Lactarius tithymalinus	(Scop.) Fr.	1838			
Lactarius tomentosomarginatus	Hesler & A.H.Sm.	1979		North America	
Lactarius torminosulus	Knudsen & T.Borgen	1996	Piperites; Piperites	Europe	
Lactarius torminosus#	(Schaeff.) Pers.	1797	Piperites; Piperites	Europe, North America	
Lactarius tottoriensis	Matsuura	1934			
Lactarius trichodermoides	Montoya, Bandala & M. Herrera	2018			
Lactarius tricolor	Massee	1908			
Lactarius trivialis	(Fr.) Fr.	1838	Piperites; Glutinosi; Trivialini	Europe, North America	
Lactarius tuberculatus	X.H. Wang	2018			
Lactarius tuomikoskii	Kytöv.	1984	Piperites; Zonarii; Scrobiculati	Europe	
Lactarius turpis#	(Weinm.) Fr.	1838	Piperites; Atroviridi	Europe, North America	
Lactarius umbrinopapillatus	Hesler & A.H.Sm.	1979		North America	
Lactarius umerensis	McNabb	1971			
Lactarius undulatus	Verbeken	1996			
Lactarius unicolor	Gooss.-Font. & R. Heim	1955			
Lactarius ustulatus	H. Lee, Wisitr. & Y.W. Lim	2019			
Lactarius uvidus	(Fr.) Fr.	1838	Piperites; Uvidi; Uvidini	Europe, North Africa, North America	
Lactarius variegatus	(Thiers) P.M. Kirk	2015			
Lactarius verbekenae	K. Das, J.R. Sharma & Montoya	2004			
Lactarius verecundus	Stubbe & Verbeken	2008	Plinthogali	Malaysia	
Lactarius verrucosporus	G.S. Wang & L.H. Qiu	2018			
Lactarius vesterholtii	K. Das & D. Chakr.	2015			
Lactarius vestipes	Velen.	1920			
Lactarius vietus#	(Fr.) Fr.	1838	Piperites; Glutinosi; Pyrogalini	Europe, North America	
Lactarius villosozonatus	G.F. Atk.	1918			
Lactarius villosus	Clem.	1896		North America	
Lactarius vinaceopallidus	Hesler & A.H.Sm.	1979		North America	
Lactarius vinaceorufescens	A.H.Sm.	1960		North America	
Lactarius vinaceosporus	Hesler & A.H.Sm.	1979		North America	
Lactarius violaceomarginatus	Lj.N. Vassiljeva	1950			
Lactarius violascens	(J.Otto) Fr.	1839	Piperites; Uvidi; Uvidini	Europe	
Lactarius virgatisporus	Verbeken & E. Horak	2000			
Lactarius viridinigrellus	K. Das, I. Bera & Uniyal	2019			
Lactarius viscosus	Velen.	1920			
Lactarius vividus	X.H. Wang, Nuytinck & Verbeken	2015			
Lactarius volkertii	Murrill	1915			
Lactarius walleynii	Verbeken & E. Horak	1999			
Lactarius waltersii	Hesler & A.H. Sm.	1979			
Lactarius wenquanensis	Y. Wang & Z.X. Xie	1984			
Lactarius westii	Murrill	1940		North America	
Lactarius xanthogalactus#	Peck	1907		North America	
Lactarius xanthogalus	Verbeken & E. Horak	2000			
Lactarius xanthydrorheus	Singer	1945		North America	
Lactarius yazooensis	Hesler & A.H.Sm.	1979		North America	
Lactarius yumthangensis	K. Das & Verbeken	2015			
Lactarius zebrisporus	Verbeken & E. Horak	2001			
Lactarius zonarioides	Kühner & Romagn.	1954	Piperites; Zonarii; Zonarii	Europe	
Lactarius zonarius	(Bull.) Fr.	1838	Piperites; Zonarii; Zonarii	Europe, North America	
Lactarius zugazae	G. Moreno, Montoya, Bandala & Heykoop	2001			

== English names ==
- L. affinis: Kindred milkcap
- L. alnicola: Golden milkcap
- L. argillaceifolius: Vulgar milkcap
- L. aspideus: Bright yellow milkcap
- L. aurantiacus: Orange milkcap
- L. blennius: Beech milkcap
- L. camphoratus: Curry milkcap
- L. chrysorrheus: Yellowdrop milkcap
- L. deliciosus: Saffron milkcap
- L. deterrimus: False saffron milkcap
- L. fallax: Velvety milk cap
- L. fragilis: Candy milkcap
- L. fuliginosus: Sooty milkcap
- L. fulvissimus: Tawny milkcap
- L. fumosus: Smoky milkcap
- L. glyciosmus: Coconut milkcap
- L. helvus: Fenugreek milkcap
- L. hepaticus: Liver milkcap
- L. indigo: Indigo milkcap
- L. musteus: Pine milkcap
- L. obscuratus: Alder milkcap
- L. pallidus: Pale milkcap
- L. pyrogalus: Fiery milkcap
- L. pubescens: Bearded milkcap
- L. quietus: Oakbug milkcap
- L. representaneus: Northern bearded milkcap, northern milkcap, purple-staining milkcap, yellow-bearded milkcap
- L. rubidus: Candy milkcap
- L. rubrilacteus: Bleeding milkcap
- L. rufulus: Rufus (rufous) Candy milkcap
- L. rufus: Rufous milkcap
- L. serifluus: Watery milkcap
- L. spinosulus: Lilacscale milkcap
- L. subdulcis: Mild milkcap
- L. subflammeus: Orange milkcap
- L. tabidus: Birch milkcap
- L. torminosus: Woolly milkcap
- L. turpis: Ugly milkcap
- L. vietus: Grey milkcap
- L. xanthogalactus: Pepper milkcap
