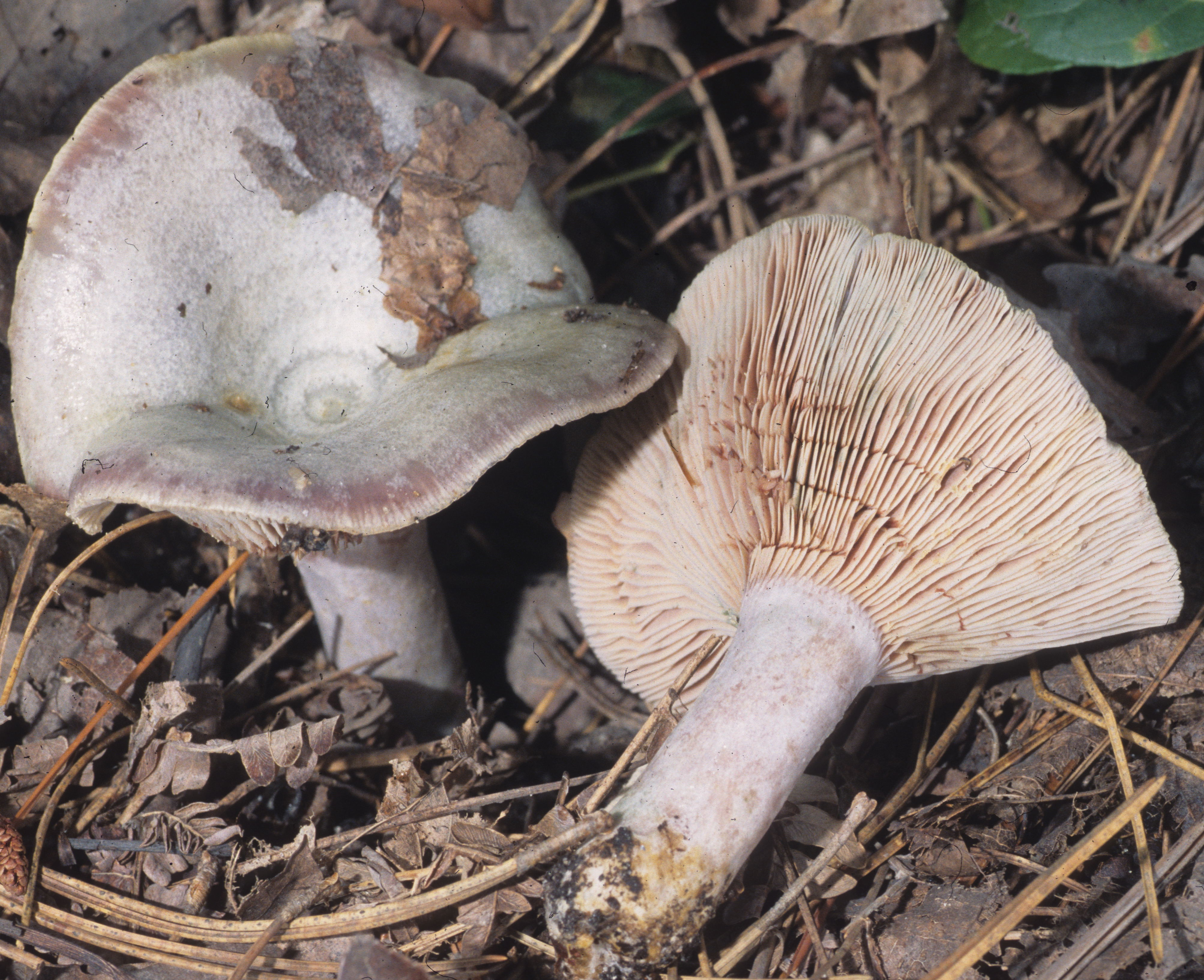

Scientific classification
- Kingdom: Fungi
- Division: Basidiomycota
- Class: Agaricomycetes
- Order: Russulales
- Family: Russulaceae
- Genus: Lactarius
- Species: L. paradoxus

Binomial name
- Lactarius paradoxus Beardslee & Burl. (1940)

= Lactarius paradoxus =

Species of fungus

Lactarius paradoxus is a North American member of the large milk-cap genus, Lactarius, in the order Russulales. The mushroom is blue-green to gray, staining green and bleeding red latex. It is edible but becomes bitter with age.

== Taxonomy ==
The species was first described in 1940.

== Description ==
The cap is blue-green to gray and 4–8 centimetres (1 1/2–3 1/4 in) wide. The stipe is 1.5–3.5 cm (1/2–1 1/2 in) long and up to 1.3 cm wide.

When damaged, the mushroom stains green and bleeds dark red latex. The flesh is bluish white, odorless, and mild tasting to slightly bitter. The spore print is light yellowish.

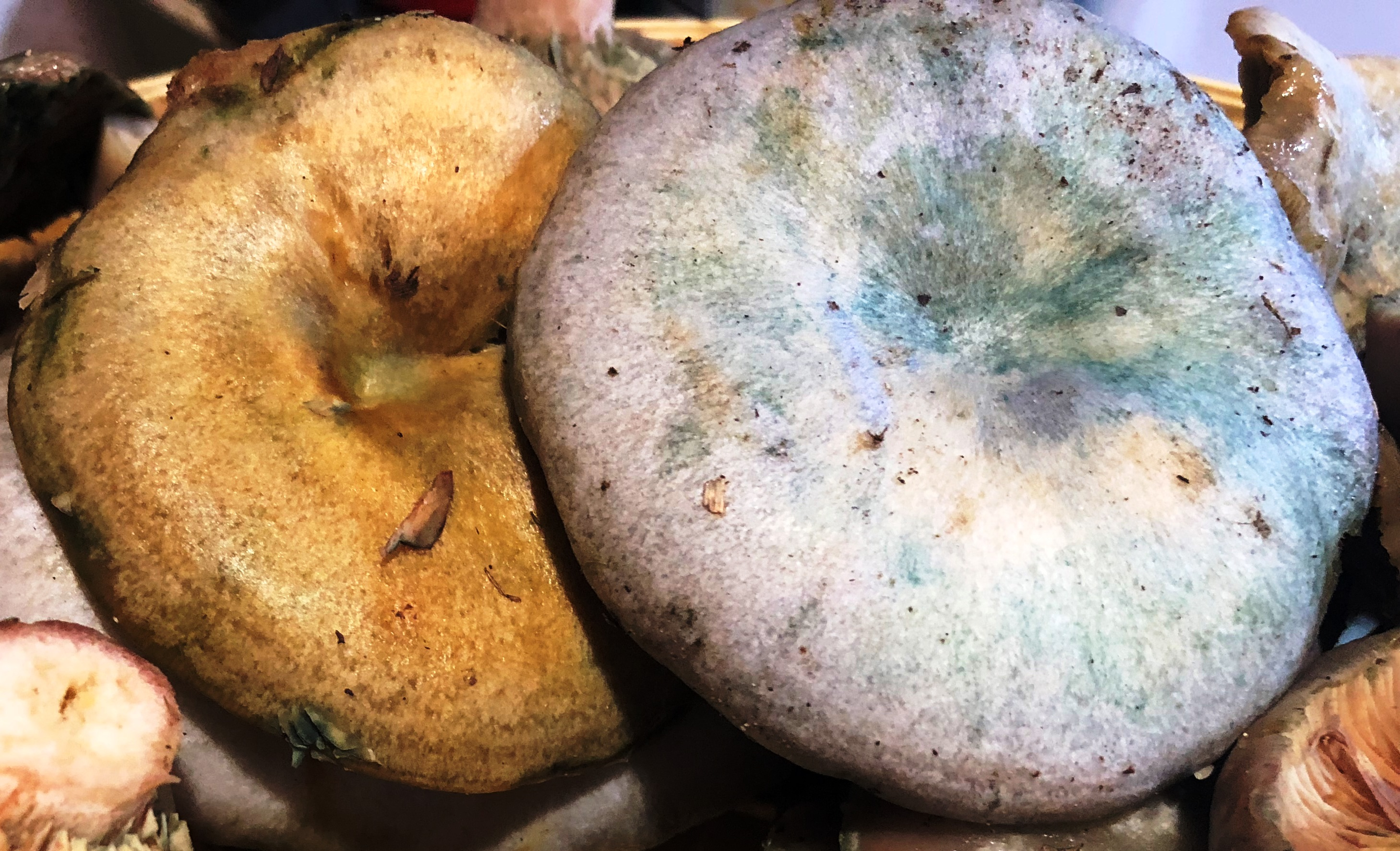
Caps

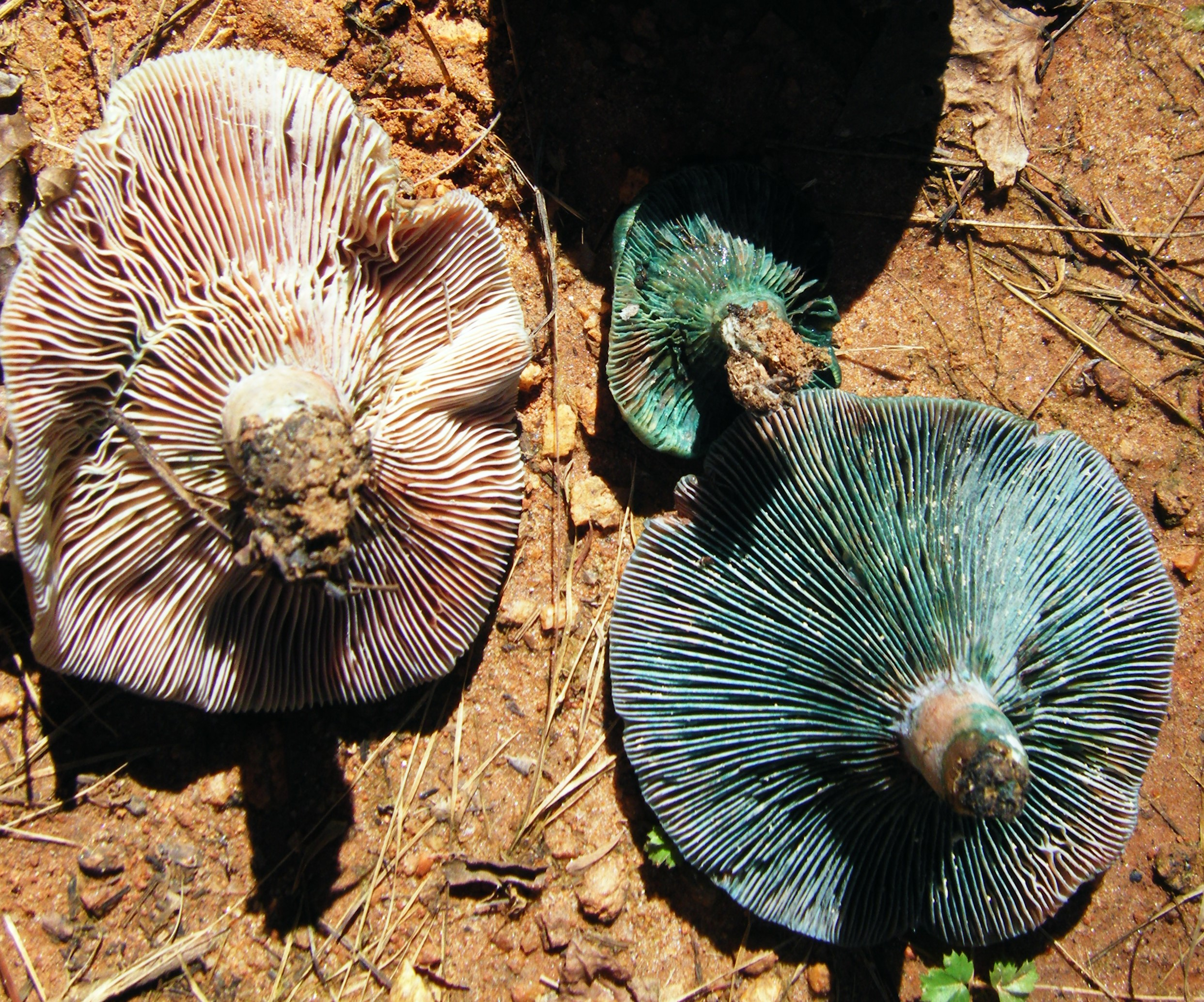
Undersides

=== Similar species ===
Lactarius indigo looks similar, but with a blue latex. Lactarius rubrilacteus has a reddish latex and does not appear blue. Additionally, L. chelidonium and L. subpurpureus are similar.

== Distribution and habitat ==
Fruiting from early fall to late winter, the species is found in the southern and eastern United States. It appears in grass and under pines. It is mycorrhizal with pine and oak.

== Edibility ==
The species is edible and mild, but bitter if too old.

== See also ==
- List of Lactarius species
