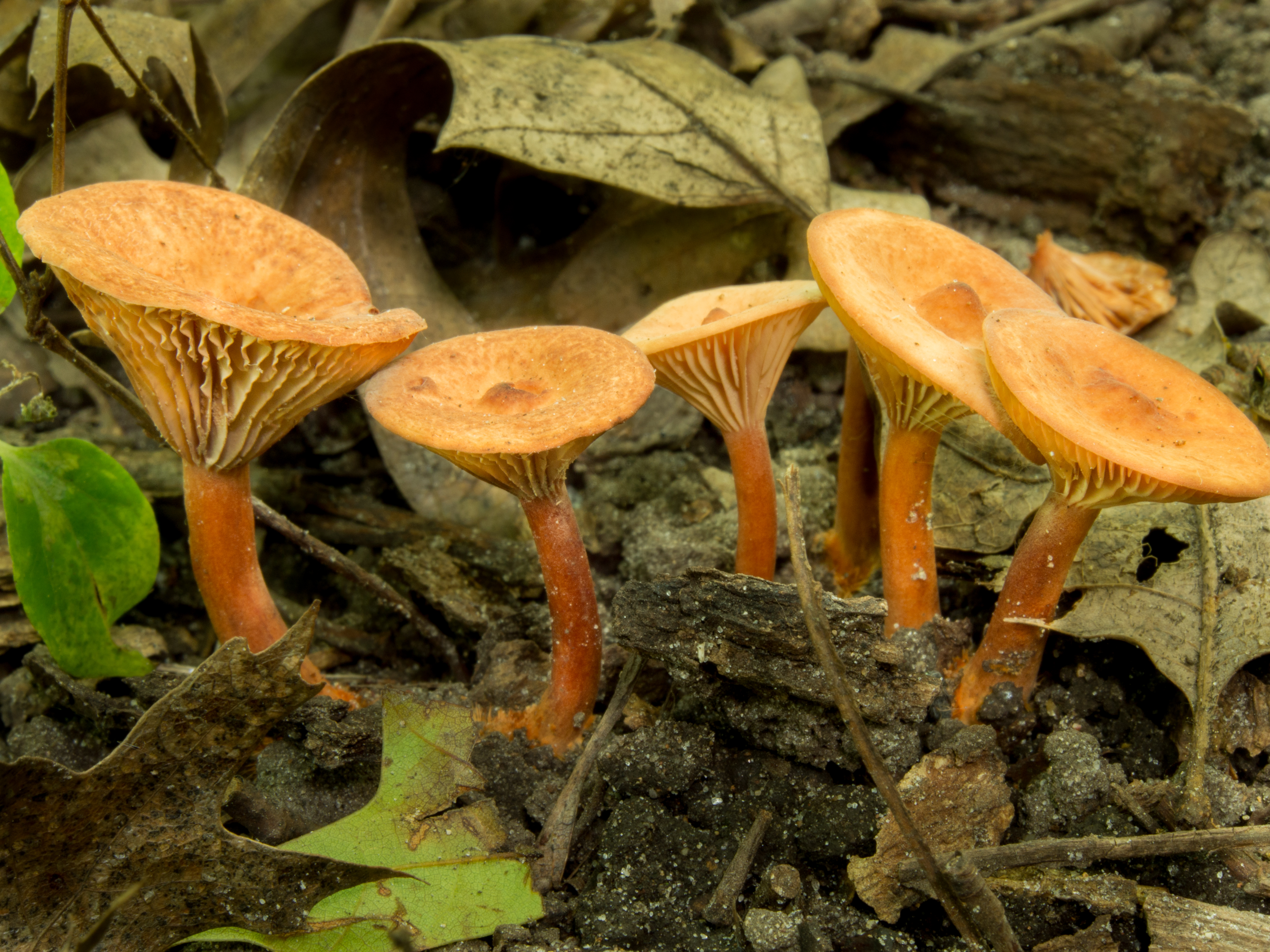

Scientific classification
- Domain: Eukaryota
- Kingdom: Fungi
- Division: Basidiomycota
- Class: Agaricomycetes
- Order: Russulales
- Family: Russulaceae
- Genus: Lactarius
- Species: L. subserifluus

Binomial name
- Lactarius subserifluus Longyear (1902)

= Lactarius subserifluus =

Species of fungus

Lactarius subserifluus is a member of the milk-cap genus Lactarius in the order Russulales. Found in the United States, it was scientifically described by botanist Burton Orange Longyear in 1902 from collections made in Michigan. Its fruitbodies are reddish orange with a dense stipe that has a tuft of rust-colored hairs at its base. The latex is watery and colorless. The fungus grows under hardwoods, usually in stands of oak and hickory. Spores are spherical or nearly so, measuring 6–7.5 to 6–7 μm.

== See also ==
- List of Lactarius species
