= Lactarius albolutescens =

Scientific classification
- Domain: Eukaryota
- Kingdom: Fungi
- Division: Basidiomycota
- Class: Agaricomycetes
- Order: Russulales
- Family: Russulaceae
- Genus: Lactarius
- Species: L. albolutescens

Binomial name
- Lactarius albolutescens Thiers, 1957

Species of fungus

Lactarius albolutescens is a member of the large genus Lactarius (order Russulales), known as milk-caps. Found in North America, the species was first described in 1957 by American mycologist Harry D. Thiers.

== See also ==
- List of Lactarius species
