= Lactarius quercuum =

Scientific classification
- Domain: Eukaryota
- Kingdom: Fungi
- Division: Basidiomycota
- Class: Agaricomycetes
- Order: Russulales
- Family: Russulaceae
- Genus: Lactarius
- Species: L. quercuum

Binomial name
- Lactarius quercuum Singer (1963)

Species of fungus

Lactarius quercuum is a member of the large milk-cap genus Lactarius in the order Russulales. Described as new to science in 1963 by American mycologist Rolf Singer, the species is found in Bolivia.

== See also ==
- List of Lactarius species
