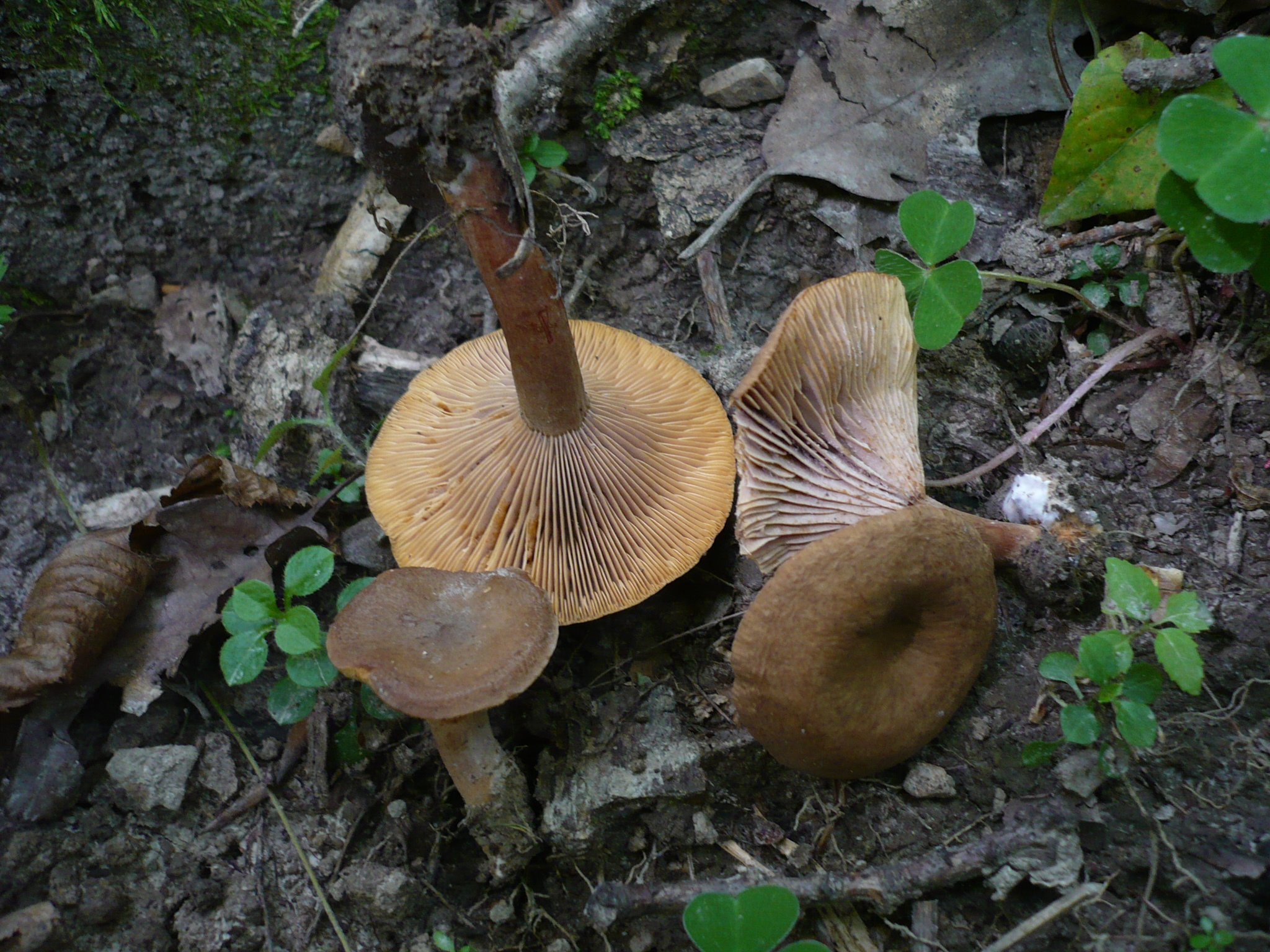

Scientific classification
- Domain: Eukaryota
- Kingdom: Fungi
- Division: Basidiomycota
- Class: Agaricomycetes
- Order: Russulales
- Family: Russulaceae
- Genus: Lactarius
- Species: L. subumbonatus

Binomial name
- Lactarius subumbonatus Lindgr. (1845)

Synonyms
- Lactifluus subumbonatus (Lindgr.) Kuntze (1891)

= Lactarius subumbonatus =

Species of fungus

Lactarius subumbonatus is a member of the large milk-cap genus Lactarius in the order Russulales. It was first described scientifically by Sven Johan Lindgren in 1845.

== See also ==
- List of Lactarius species
