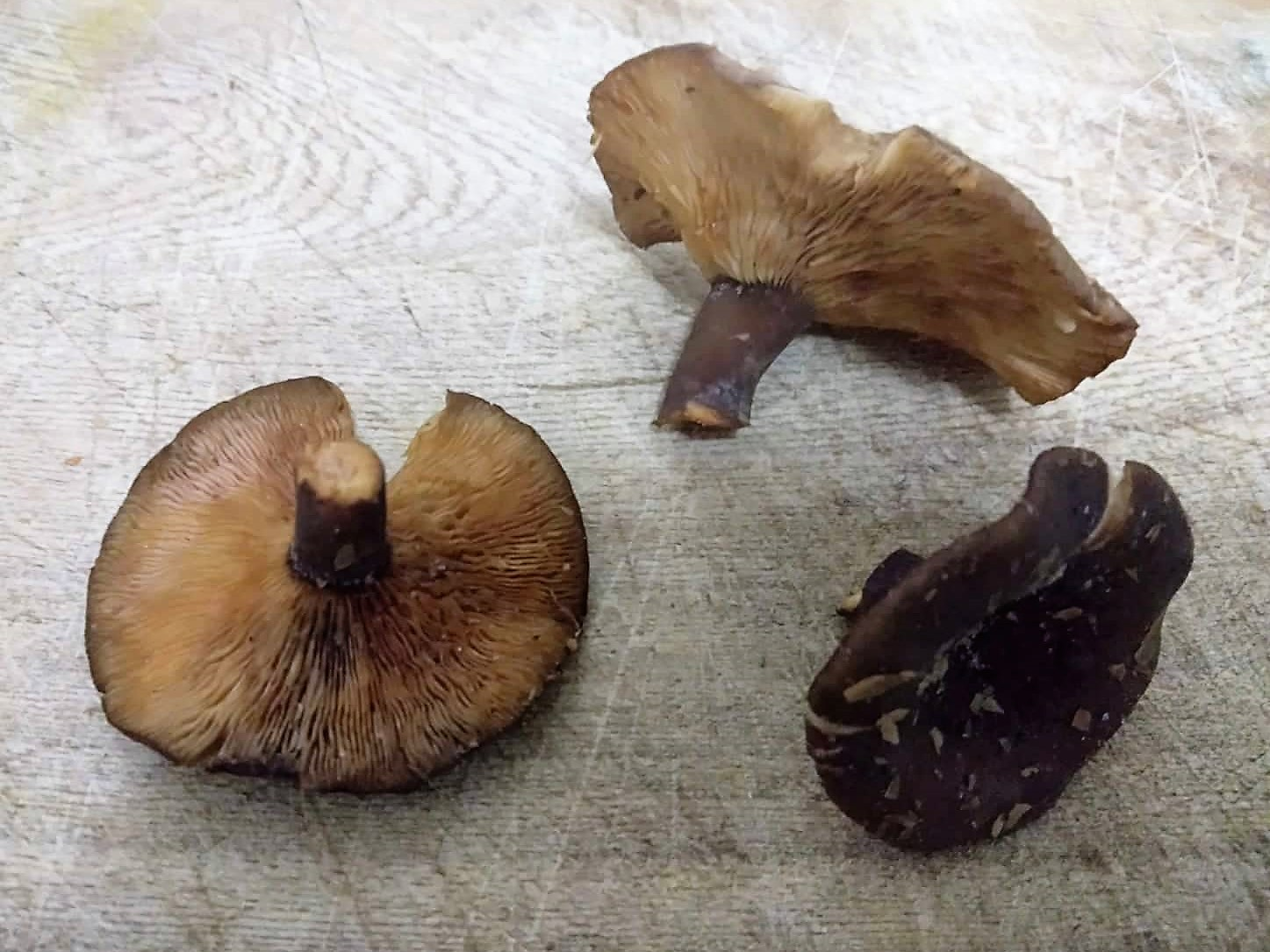

Scientific classification
- Domain: Eukaryota
- Kingdom: Fungi
- Division: Basidiomycota
- Class: Agaricomycetes
- Order: Russulales
- Family: Russulaceae
- Genus: Lactarius
- Species: L. kabansus

Binomial name
- Lactarius kabansus Pegler & Piearce (1980)

= Lactarius kabansus =

Species of fungus

Lactarius kabansus is a member of the large milk-cap genus Lactarius in the order Russulales. Described as new to science in 1980, the species is found in Zambia. This is a popular edible mushroom in Zambia which is found in the rainy season from December through February. It is prepared by rinsing with salt to remove soil and frying. Amanita zambiana and Lactarius kabansus are two of the most popular edible mushrooms in Zambia.

The mushroom gets its scientific name from kabansa, its name in Bemba.

== See also ==
- List of Lactarius species
