= Lactarius adhaerens =

Scientific classification
- Domain: Eukaryota
- Kingdom: Fungi
- Division: Basidiomycota
- Class: Agaricomycetes
- Order: Russulales
- Family: Russulaceae
- Genus: Lactarius
- Species: L. adhaerens

Binomial name
- Lactarius adhaerens R. Heim, 1938

Species of fungus

Lactarius adhaerens is a member of the large milk-cap genus Lactarius in the order Russulales. It is found in Madagascar, where it grows on decayed wood. The species was first described in 1938 by French botanist Roger Heim.

== See also ==
- List of Lactarius species
