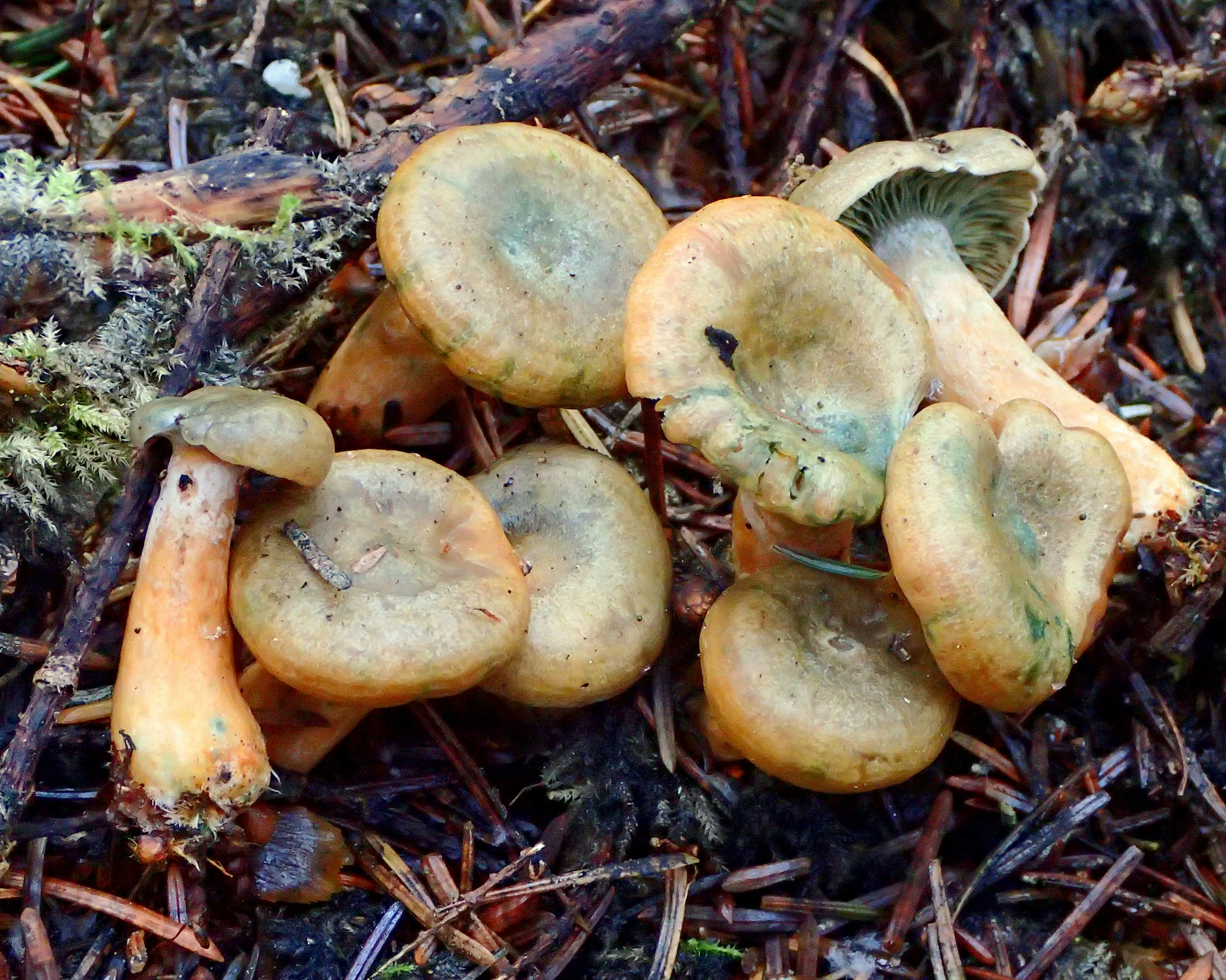

Conservation status
- Least Concern (IUCN 3.1)

Scientific classification
- Kingdom: Fungi
- Division: Basidiomycota
- Class: Agaricomycetes
- Order: Russulales
- Family: Russulaceae
- Genus: Lactarius
- Species: L. aurantiosordidus

Binomial name
- Lactarius aurantiosordidus Nuytinck & S.L. Mill. 2006

Synonyms
- Lactarius deliciosus var. olivaceosordidus Hesler and Smith 1979

= Lactarius aurantiosordidus =

Species of fungus

Lactarius aurantiosordidus
- Mycological characteristics
- Gills on hymenium
- Cap is depressed
- Hymenium is adnate or decurrent
- Stipe is bare
- Ecology is mycorrhizal
- Edibility is edible

Lactarius aurantiosordidus, commonly known as the sordid orange milk cap, is a species of Lactarius fungus found from northern California to Alaska. It has an orangish cap, often with greenish stains. The gills are also orangish, also with greenish stains. When cut, this mushroom produces a small amount of orangish latex.

It is found coastal forests, where it forms a symbiotic relationship with sitka spruce.

== See also ==
- List of Lactarius species
