= Lactarius adscitus =

Scientific classification
- Domain: Eukaryota
- Kingdom: Fungi
- Division: Basidiomycota
- Class: Agaricomycetes
- Order: Russulales
- Family: Russulaceae
- Genus: Lactarius
- Species: L. adscitus

Binomial name
- Lactarius adscitus Britzelm., 1885

Species of fungus

Lactarius adscitus is a member of the large milk-cap genus Lactarius in the order Russulales. The species was first described in 1885 by German mycologist Max Britzelmayr.

== See also ==
- List of Lactarius species
