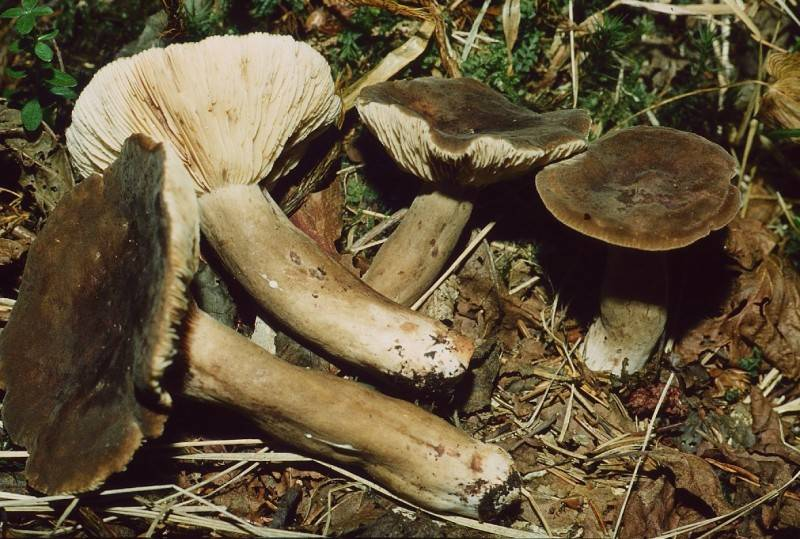

Scientific classification
- Domain: Eukaryota
- Kingdom: Fungi
- Division: Basidiomycota
- Class: Agaricomycetes
- Order: Russulales
- Family: Russulaceae
- Genus: Lactarius
- Species: L. fuliginellus

Binomial name
- Lactarius fuliginellus A.H.Sm. & Hesler (1962)

= Lactarius fuliginellus =

Species of fungus

Lactarius fuliginellus is a species of fungus in the family Russulaceae. Described as a new species in 1962 by American mycologists Alexander H. Smith and Lexemuel Ray Hesler, the mushroom is found in North America.

== See also ==
- List of Lactarius species
