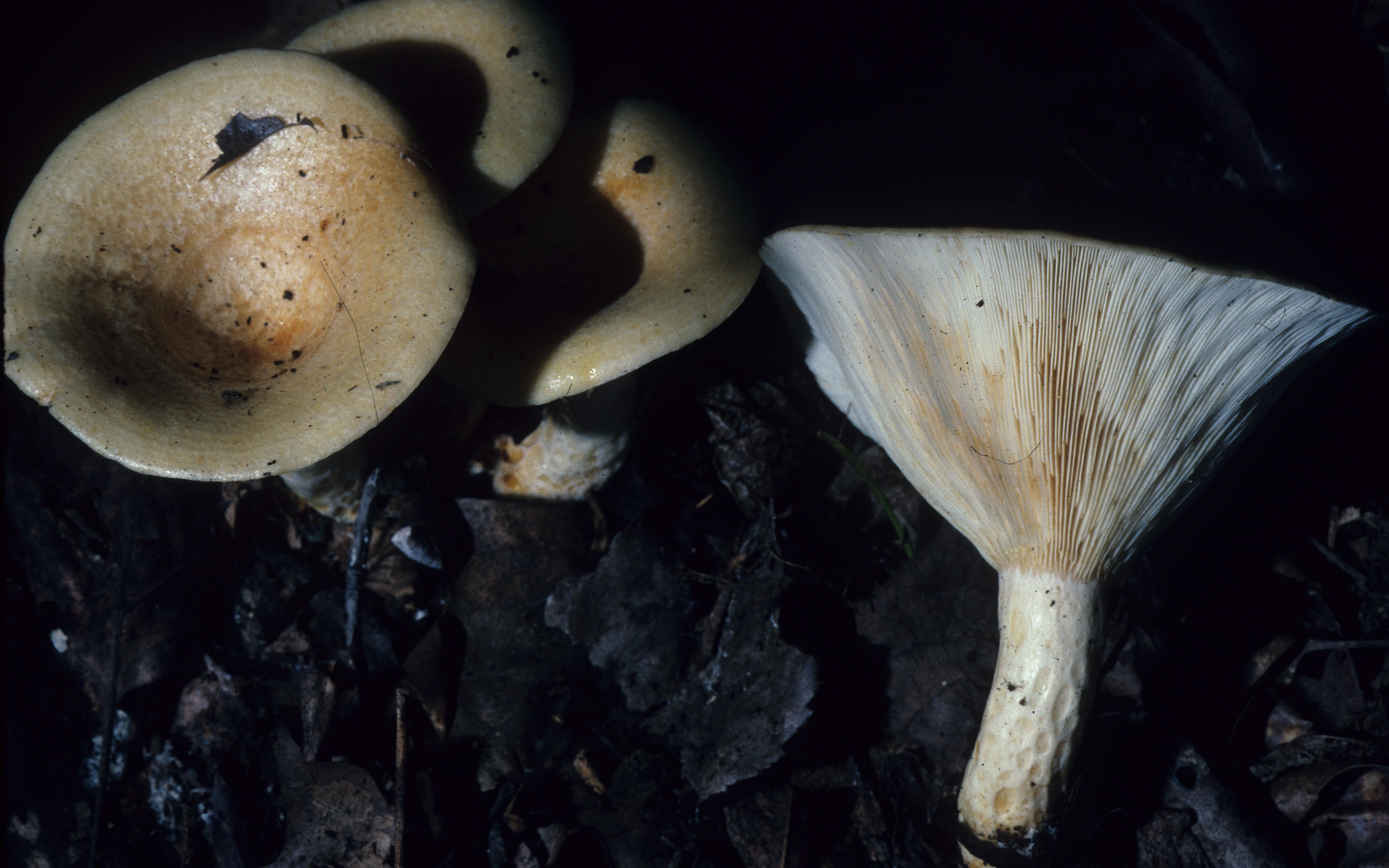

Scientific classification
- Domain: Eukaryota
- Kingdom: Fungi
- Division: Basidiomycota
- Class: Agaricomycetes
- Order: Russulales
- Family: Russulaceae
- Genus: Lactarius
- Species: L. maculatipes

Binomial name
- Lactarius maculatipes Burl. (1942)

= Lactarius maculatipes =

Species of fungus

Lactarius maculatipes is a member of the large milk-cap genus Lactarius in the order Russulales. The species was described as new to science by mycologist Gertrude S. Burlingham in 1942.

== See also ==
- List of Lactarius species
