= Lactarius alachuanus =

Scientific classification
- Domain: Eukaryota
- Kingdom: Fungi
- Division: Basidiomycota
- Class: Agaricomycetes
- Order: Russulales
- Family: Russulaceae
- Genus: Lactarius
- Species: L. alachuanus

Binomial name
- Lactarius alachuanus Murrill, 1938

Species of fungus

Lactarius alachuanus is a member of the large genus Lactarius (order Russulales), known as milk-caps. Found in North America, the species was first described in 1938 by American mycologist William Alphonso Murrill. It is associated with oaks (Quercus spp.).

== See also ==
- List of Lactarius species
