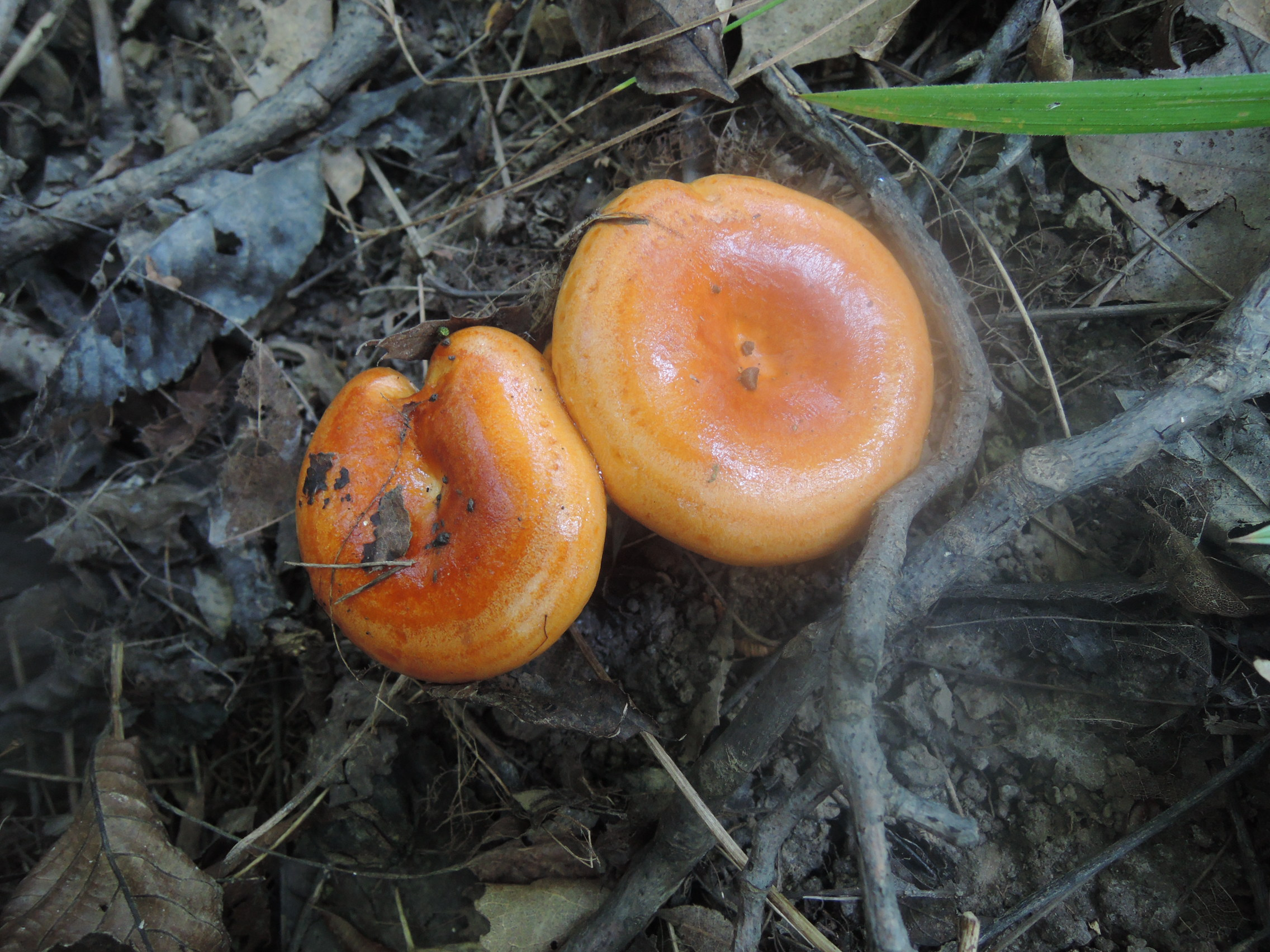

Scientific classification
- Domain: Eukaryota
- Kingdom: Fungi
- Division: Basidiomycota
- Class: Agaricomycetes
- Order: Russulales
- Family: Russulaceae
- Genus: Lactarius
- Species: L. agglutinatus

Binomial name
- Lactarius agglutinatus Burl., 1908

= Lactarius agglutinatus =

Species of fungus

Lactarius agglutinatus is a member of the large milk-cap genus Lactarius in the order Russulales. Found in North America, the species was first described in 1908 by mycologist Gertrude Simmons Burlingham.

== See also ==
- List of Lactarius species
