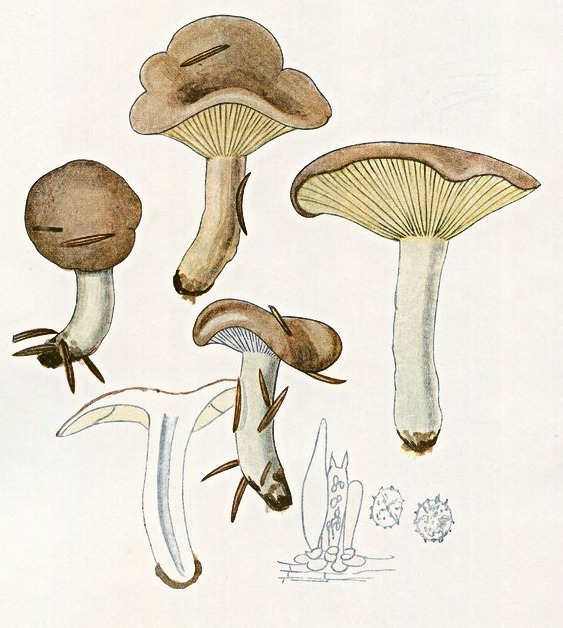

Scientific classification
- Domain: Eukaryota
- Kingdom: Fungi
- Division: Basidiomycota
- Class: Agaricomycetes
- Order: Russulales
- Family: Russulaceae
- Genus: Lactarius
- Species: L. albocarneus

Binomial name
- Lactarius albocarneus Britzelm., 1895

Synonyms
- Lactifluus albocarneus (Britzelm.) Kuntze, 1898

= Lactarius albocarneus =

Species of fungus

Lactarius albocarneus is a member of the large genus Lactarius (order Russulales), known as milk-caps. Found in Europe, the species was first described in 1895 by German mycologist Max Britzelmayr.

== See also ==
- List of Lactarius species
