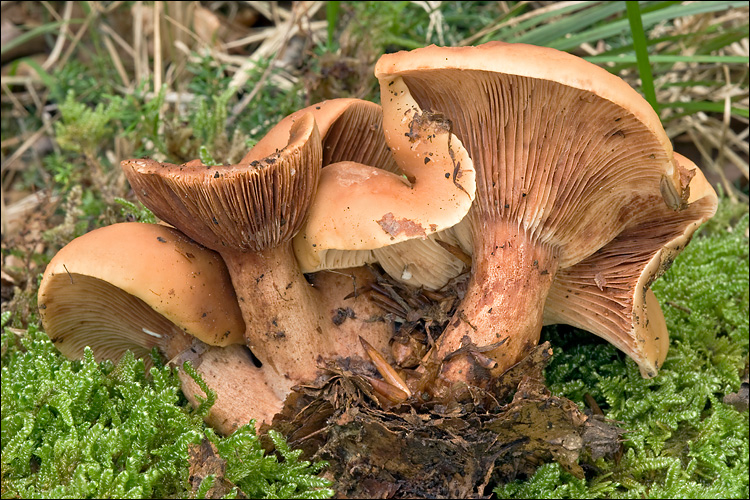

Scientific classification
- Domain: Eukaryota
- Kingdom: Fungi
- Division: Basidiomycota
- Class: Agaricomycetes
- Order: Russulales
- Family: Russulaceae
- Genus: Lactarius
- Species: L. fulvissimus

Binomial name
- Lactarius fulvissimus Romagn. (1954)

Synonyms
- Lactarius britannicus D.A.Reid (1969); Lactarius subsericatus Kühner & Romagn. ex Bon (1979)

= Lactarius fulvissimus =

Species of fungus

Lactarius fulvissimus is a species of fungus in the family Russulaceae. It was first described scientifically by Henri Romagnesi in 1954.

== See also ==
- List of Lactarius species
