= Lactarius villosus =

Scientific classification
- Domain: Eukaryota
- Kingdom: Fungi
- Division: Basidiomycota
- Class: Agaricomycetes
- Order: Russulales
- Family: Russulaceae
- Genus: Lactarius
- Species: L. villosus

Binomial name
- Lactarius villosus Clem. (1896)

Species of fungus

Lactarius villosus is a member of the large milk-cap genus Lactarius in the order Russulales. Found in Nebraska, the species was described in 1896 by Frederick Edward Clements.

== See also ==
- List of Lactarius species
