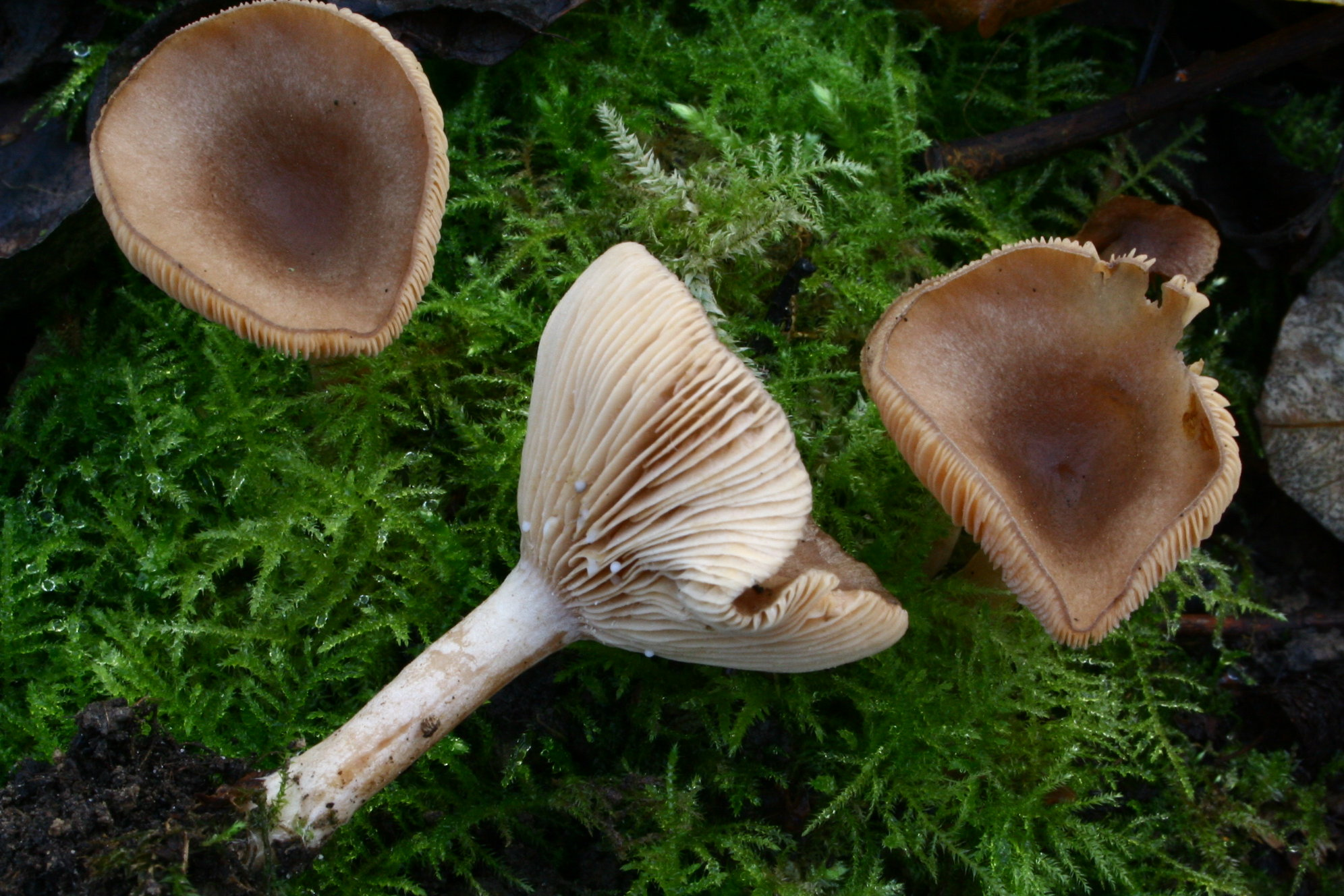

Scientific classification
- Kingdom: Fungi
- Division: Basidiomycota
- Class: Agaricomycetes
- Order: Russulales
- Family: Russulaceae
- Genus: Lactarius
- Species: L. glyciosmus

Binomial name
- Lactarius glyciosmus (Fr. ex Fr.) Fr. (1838)

Synonyms
- Agaricus glyciosmus Fr. (1818); Galorrheus glyciosmus (Fr.) P.Kumm. (1871); Lactifluus glyciosmus (Fr.) Kuntze (1891)

= Lactarius glyciosmus =

Species of fungus

Lactarius glyciosmus
- Mycological characteristics
- Gills on hymenium
- Cap is convex
- Hymenium is decurrent
- Stipe is bare
- Spore print is cream
- Ecology is mycorrhizal
- Edibility is edible

Lactarius glyciosmus, commonly known as the coconut milk cap or coconut scented milk cap, is a semi-edible mushroom in the genus Lactarius. It is typically coloured a greyish lilac, with the sometimes hollow stem a little lighter coloured than the cap. It has crowded, decurrent gills, and smells strongly of coconuts. Mycorrhizal, it can be found growing in soil at the base of birch trees in Europe.

== Taxonomy ==
Lactarius glyciosmus was initially described by the Swedish mycologist Elias Magnus Fries as Agaricus glyciosmus in 1818. Its specific name is derived from the Ancient Greek words glukos "sugar(y)", and osmos "smell".

== Description ==
Lactarius glyciosmus is a small to medium-sized agaric, which typically has a convex cap measuring between 2 and 6 centimetres (3/4 and 2 1/4 in), with a small central depression developing with age. Sometimes there is a central pimple, and the cap is typically coloured a greyish lilac, sometimes varying to a pale buff. It is thin fleshed, with an incurved margin in younger specimens. The stem measures between 25 and 65 millimetres (1 and 2 1/2 in) in height, with a width between 4 and 12 mm (1/8 and 1/2 in). The cylindrical stem is typically widest at the bottom becoming narrower towards the top, or sometimes club shaped. The stem is concolorous with the cap, but sometimes is a little paler or with a yellowish hue. The stem is particularly soft and easily broken, and can become hollow. The flesh is buff. The gills are decurrent and crowded, and vary in colour from a pale yellowish to a pale flesh, turning to a greyish lilac with age. The milk is white with an initially mild, later hot and acrid taste. The mushroom has a strong smell of coconuts.

The spore print is a creamy white colour, and the spores themselves are broadly elliptic in shape, and covered with small warts. The warts are connected by thin ridges in an incomplete network. The spores measure between 8 and 9 by between 5 and 6 micrometres.

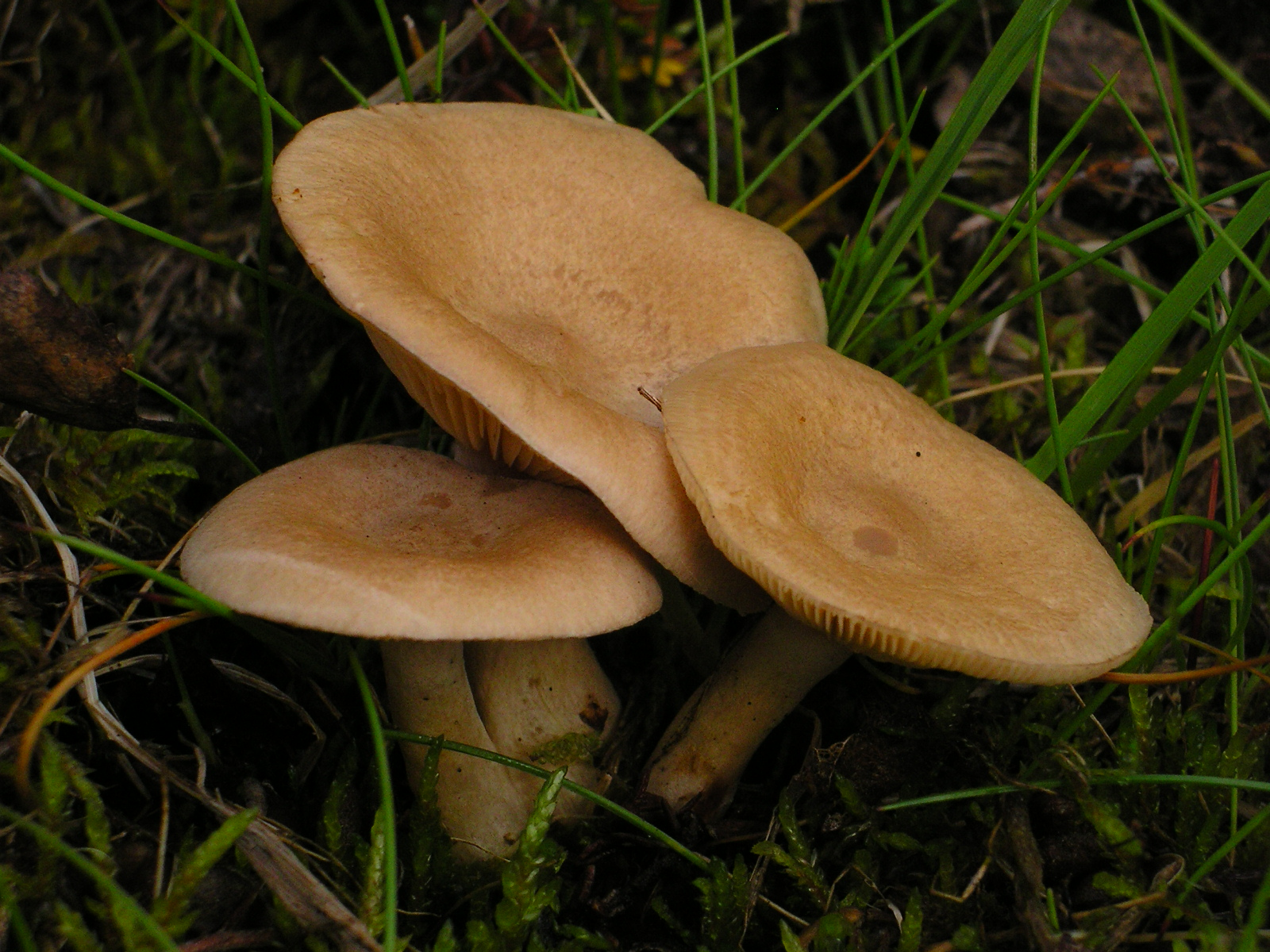
Specimen in Sweden

=== Similar species ===
It is similar to L. vietus, the grey milk cap, but is differentiated by the fact L. vietus milk dries grey, while L. glyciosmus milk dries white. It can also be confused with L. cocosiolens, which also smells of coconuts, but L. cocosiolens has a slimy brown or orange cap and is not found among birch.

== Distribution and habitat ==
Lactarius glyciosmus is a common mushroom and is found under broad-leaved trees, particularly birch—often inside of sphagnum moss. It can be found between late summer and autumn. It grows in soil individually or in scattered groups. It can be found in North America and Europe, New Zealand, Svalbard, Japan, and China.

== Edibility ==
Lactarius glyciosmus is considered edible, but is not recommended by some mycologists. This species is sold in rural markets in Yunnan Province, China.

Sesquiterpenes isolated from L. glyciosmus

== Natural products ==
Different compounds, including several sesquiterpenes, have been isolated from L. glyciosmus.

== See also ==
- List of Lactarius species
