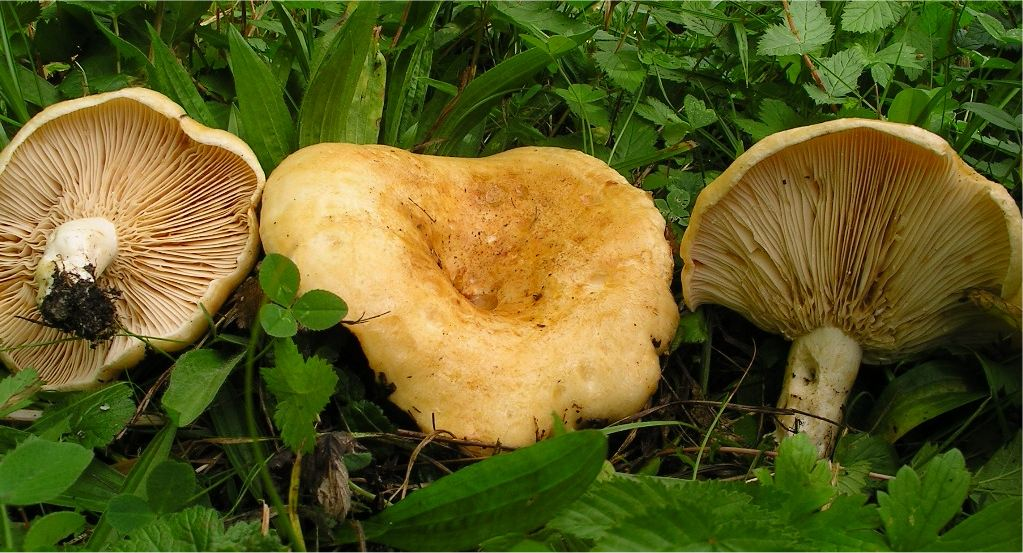
- Lactarius acerrimus photographed in Gotland, Sweden

Scientific classification
- Kingdom: Fungi
- Division: Basidiomycota
- Class: Agaricomycetes
- Order: Russulales
- Family: Russulaceae
- Genus: Lactarius
- Species: L. acerrimus

Binomial name
- Lactarius acerrimus Britzelm. (1893)

= Lactarius acerrimus =

Species of fungus

Lactarius acerrimus is a member of the large milk-cap genus Lactarius in the order Russulales. It was first described by Max Britzelmayr in 1893.

== Description ==
The mushroom's cap has between 5 and 15 cm in diameter. It sometimes takes a funneled shape when old. The lamella is cream-coloured when young, taking on an ochre colour as it matures. Its edge is smooth, undulated and irregular. The stem is short and stubby, measuring between 2 and 5 cm in length, and between 0.8 and 2 cm thick.

== Distribution ==
Distribution of Lactarius acerrimus in European countries.

The species can be found mainly in Europe, but has been reported in North America and in Morocco.

== See also ==
- List of Lactarius species
