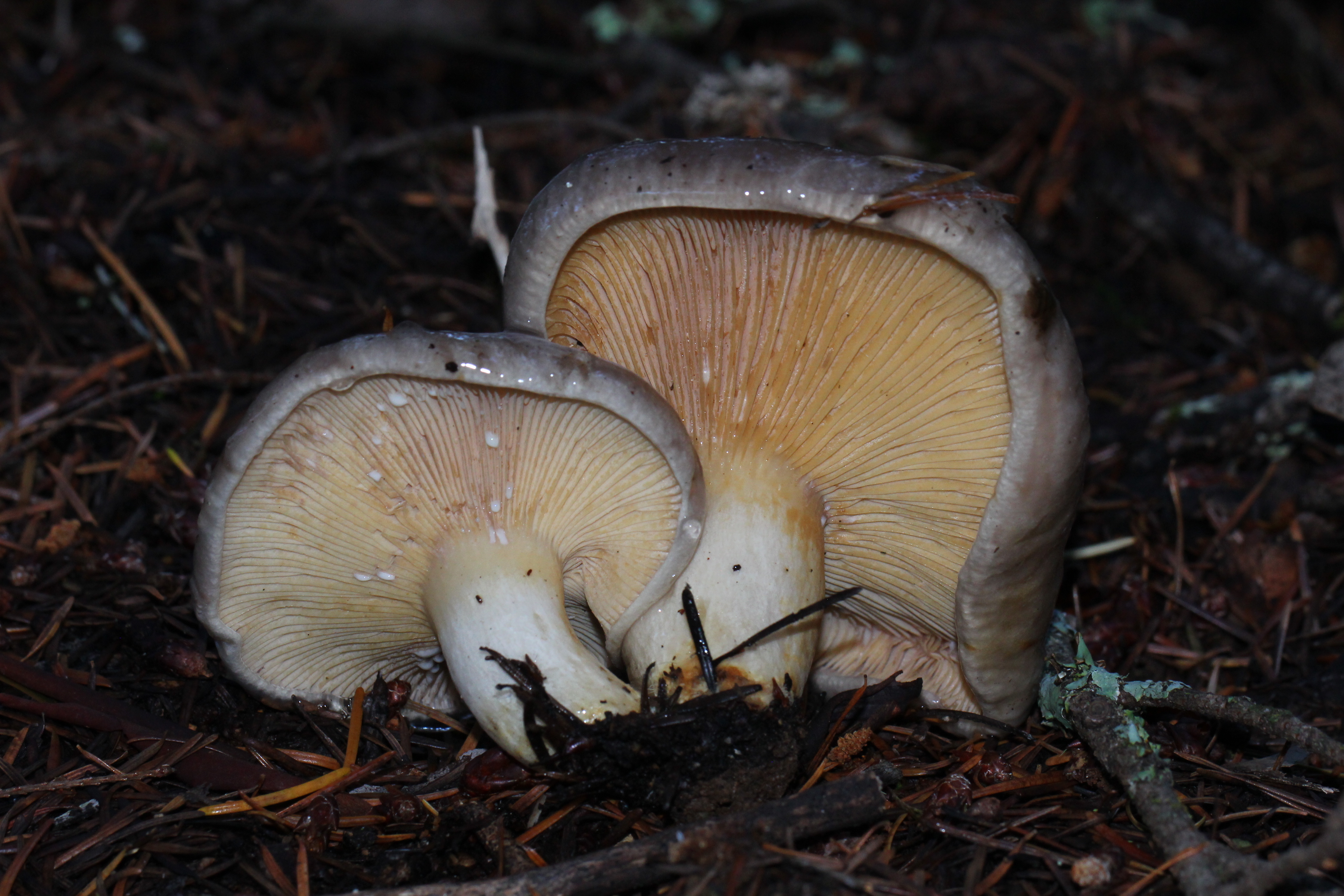

Scientific classification
- Kingdom: Fungi
- Division: Basidiomycota
- Class: Agaricomycetes
- Order: Russulales
- Family: Russulaceae
- Genus: Lactarius
- Species: L. pallescens

Binomial name
- Lactarius pallescens Hesler & A.H. Sm. (1979)

= Lactarius pallescens =

Species of fungus

Lactarius pallescens
- Mycological characteristics
- Gills on hymenium
- Cap is flat or depressed
- Hymenium is subdecurrent
- Stipe is bare
- Spore print is white
- Ecology is mycorrhizal
- Edibility is unknown

Lactarius pallescens, commonly known as the pallid purple-staining milk cap, is a Western North American "milk-cap" mushroom, of which the milk turns violet when the flesh is damaged. The fungi generally identified as L. pallescens are part of a complex of closely related species and varieties which have a peppery taste and are difficult to delimit definitively.

The gray-brown cap ranges from 3 to 10 cm in width, with a mucilaginous surface, whitish flesh and white latex. The gills are whitish and sometimes slightly decurrent. The viscid stalk ranges from 3 to 8 cm long and 1 to 2 cm wide. The spores are pale yellow to orange, elliptical, and bumpy. The flesh of the mushroom stains lilac. In age, reddish stains develop.

== Distribution ==
Lactarius pallescens is found on the West Coast of the United States. In the Pacific Northwest, it can be found in conifer forests.

== Related species ==
Lactarius uvidus (a close relative) and Lactarius californiensis are similar.

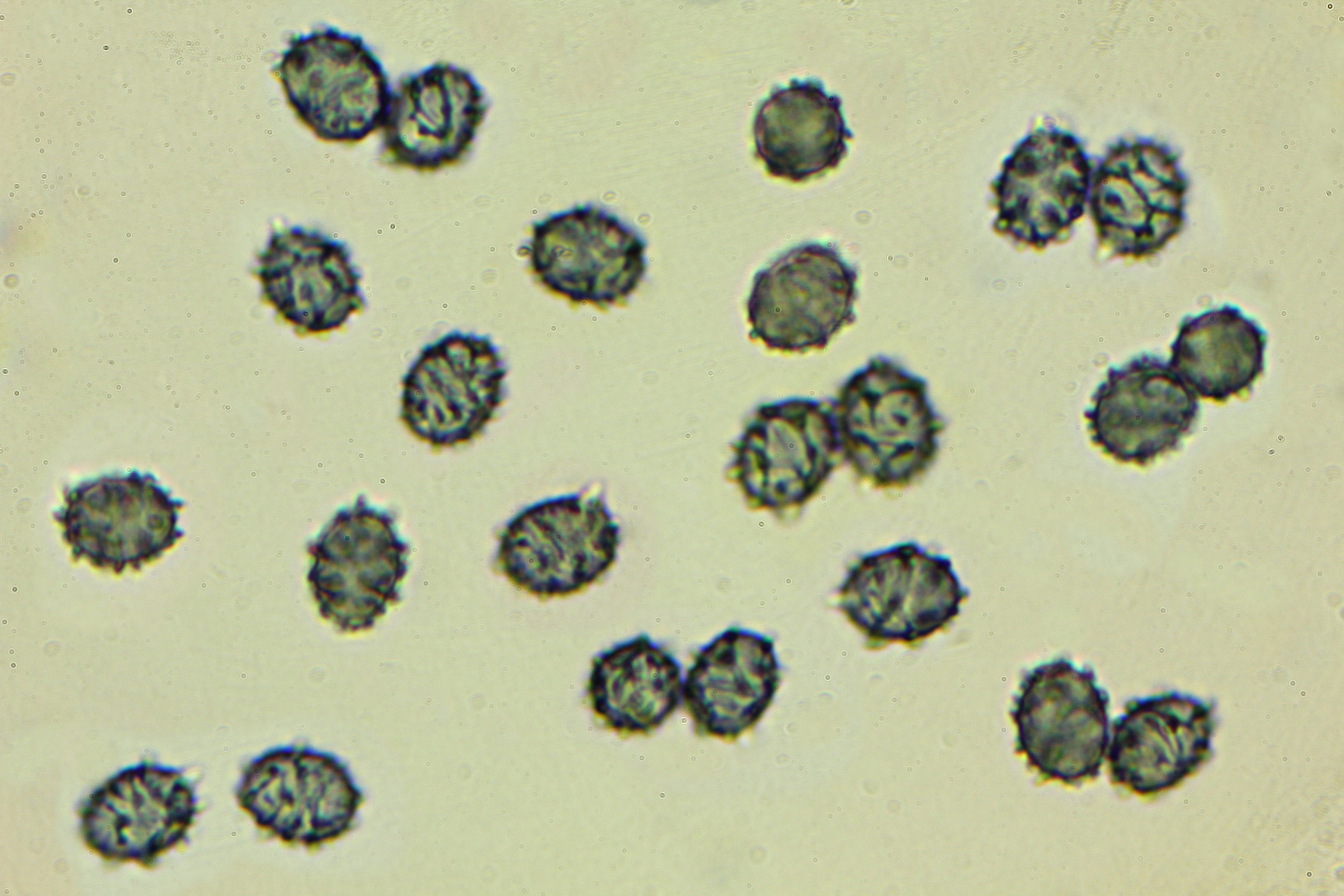
Spores 1000x in Melzers

== See also ==
- List of Lactarius species
