= Lactarius subvelutinus =

Scientific classification
- Domain: Eukaryota
- Kingdom: Fungi
- Division: Basidiomycota
- Class: Agaricomycetes
- Order: Russulales
- Family: Russulaceae
- Genus: Lactarius
- Species: L. subvelutinus

Binomial name
- Lactarius subvelutinus Peck (1904)

Species of fungus

Lactarius subvelutinus is a member of the large milk-cap genus Lactarius in the order Russulales. It was first described scientifically by American mycologist Peck in 1904.

== See also ==
- List of Lactarius species
