= Lactarius acutus =

Scientific classification
- Domain: Eukaryota
- Kingdom: Fungi
- Division: Basidiomycota
- Class: Agaricomycetes
- Order: Russulales
- Family: Russulaceae
- Genus: Lactarius
- Species: L. acutus

Binomial name
- Lactarius acutus R. Heim, 1955

Species of fungus

Lactarius acutus is a member of the large milk-cap genus Lactarius in the order Russulales. Found in Guinea, the species was described in 1955 by French botanist Roger Heim.

== See also ==
- List of Lactarius species
