= Henry Curtis Beardslee =

American mycologist (1865–1948)

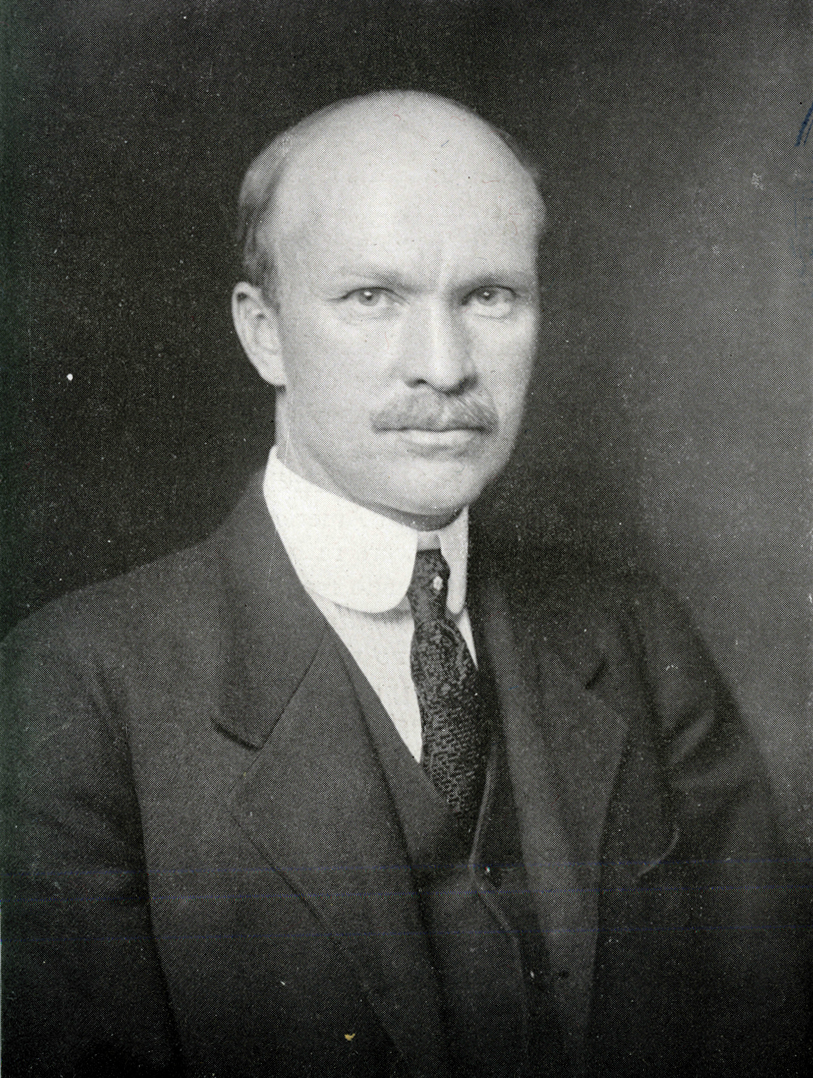
- Beardslee around 1915
- Born: 28 September 1865
- Died: 1 January 1948 (aged 82); Painesville, Ohio
- Education: Adelbert College of Western Reserve University
- Scientific career
- Fields: mycologist
- Author abbrev. (botany): Beardslee

Henry Curtis Beardslee (28 September 1865 – 1 January 1948) was an American mycologist. He published several works with William Chambers Coker, and did a lot of work in Florida with Gertrude Simmons Burlingham after they both retired there.

Beardslee graduated from Painesville High School, in Painesville, Ohio in 1883. He graduated from Western Reserve University in 1889. He was an instructor at Asheville School for boys.

Beardslee's father, also named Henry Curtis Beardslee (1807–1884), was also a botanist.

== Species ==
This is an incomplete list of species in which Beardslee was the author, or co-author with Gertrude Simmons Burlingham (Burl.). The year of description and publication may follow an entry:

- Amanita cylindrispora Beardslee 1936
- Amanita mutabilis Beardslee 1919
- Boletus betula Beardslee 1902
- Boletus carolinensis Beardslee
- Boletus rubinellus Beardslee
- Cortinarius robustus Beardslee
- Lactarius cognoscibilis Beardslee & Burl. 1940
- Lactarius floridanus Beardslee & Burl. 1940
- Lactarius imperceptus Beardslee & Burl. 1940
- Lactarius limacinus Beardslee & Burl. 1940
- Lactarius paradoxus Beardslee & Burl. 1940
- Lactarius proximellus Beardslee & Burl. 1940
- Lactarius pseudodeliciosus Beardslee & Burl. 1940
- Lepiota caerulea Beardslee
- Lepiota floccosa Beardslee
- Lepiota parva Beardslee
- Mycena anomala Beardslee 1924
- Mycena glutinosa Beardslee 1934
- Russula admirabilis Beardslee & Burl. 1939
- Russula cinerascens Beardslee 1918
- Russula flava Beardslee
- Russula heterospora Beardslee 1934
- Russula magna Beardslee 1918
- Russula pungens Beardslee 1918
- Russula rubescens Beardslee 1914
- Volvaria cinerea Beardslee 1915

== See also ==
- List of mycologists
