= Kühner =

Kühner, also spelled Kuehner, and sometimes anglicised as Kuhner, is a German surname.

Notable people with this surname include:

- Herbert Kuhner (born 1935), Austrian writer and translator
- Jeff Kuhner (born 1969), Canadian-American radio host
- Jochen Kühner (born 1980), German rower
- Jody Kuehner (born c. 1980), better known as Cherdonna Shinatra, American dancer
- Martin Kühner (born 1980), German rower
- Nikolai Kuehner (1877-1955), Soviet scientist
- Raphael Kühner (1802-1878), German classical scholar
- Robert Kühner (1903-1996), French mycologist
- Sebastian Kühner (born 1987), German volleyball player
