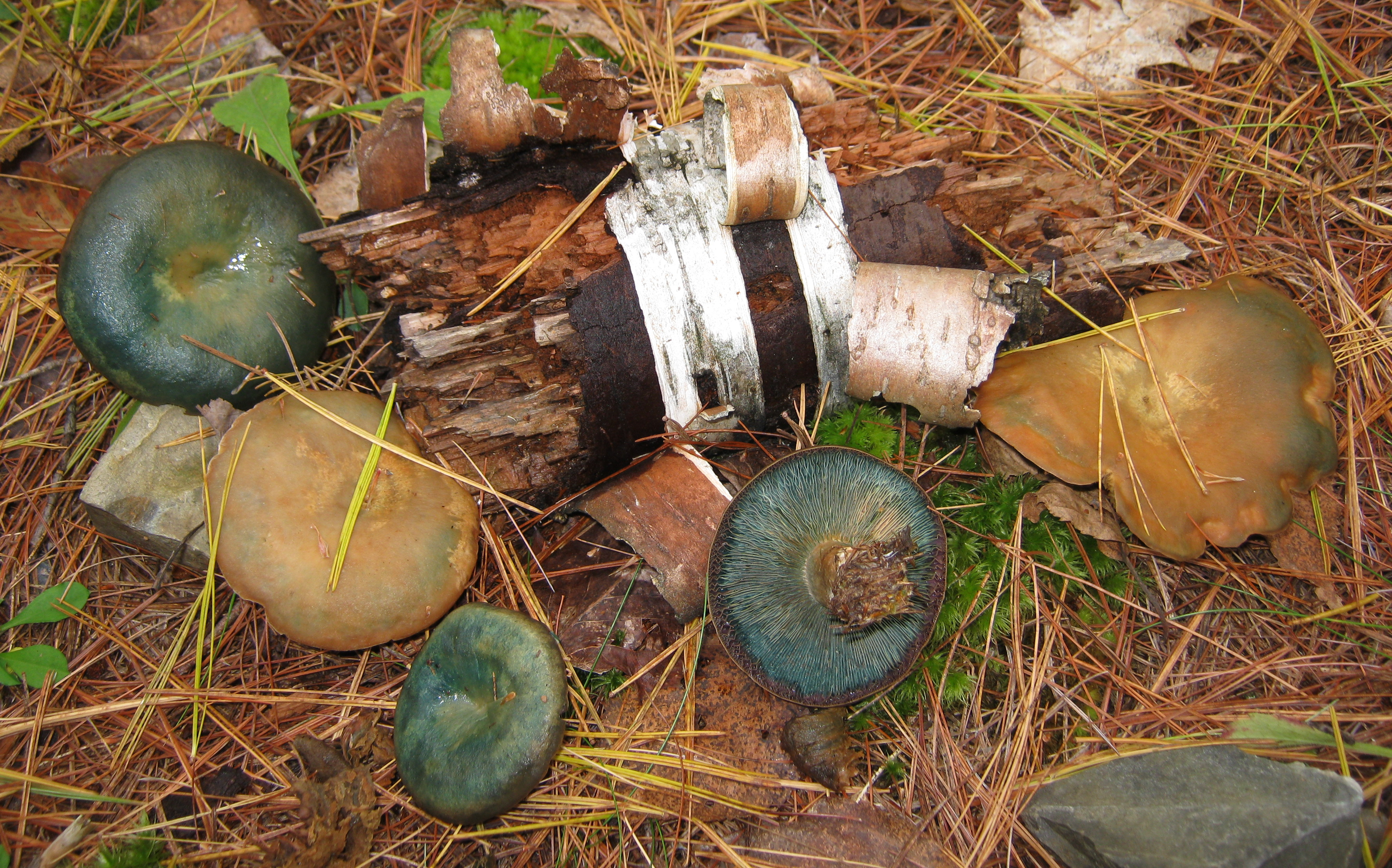

Scientific classification
- Domain: Eukaryota
- Kingdom: Fungi
- Division: Basidiomycota
- Class: Agaricomycetes
- Order: Russulales
- Family: Russulaceae
- Genus: Lactarius
- Species: L. chelidonium

Binomial name
- Lactarius chelidonium Peck (1872)

Synonyms
- Lactifluus chelidonium (Peck) Kuntze (1891)

= Lactarius chelidonium =

Species of fungus

Lactarius chelidonium is a member of the large milk-cap genus Lactarius in the order Russulales. It was first described by American mycologist Charles Horton Peck in 1870.

== See also ==
- List of Lactarius species
