= Lactarius aestivus =

Scientific classification
- Kingdom: Fungi
- Division: Basidiomycota
- Class: Agaricomycetes
- Order: Russulales
- Family: Russulaceae
- Genus: Lactarius
- Species: L. aestivus

Binomial name
- Lactarius aestivus Nuytinck & Ammirati

Species of fungus

Lactarius aestivus, commonly known as the orange fir milk cap or summer saffron milkcap, is a species of mushroom in the family Russulaceae.

== Description ==
The cap of Lactarius aestivus is orange to pale orange in color and about 3-12 centimeters in diameter. It starts out convex with an inrolled margin and becomes depressed as the mushroom matures. The gills are orange to orangish buff in color and adnate to subdecurrent. The stipe is about 3-6 centimeters long and 1-2.5 centimeters wide. It is orangish with brighter orange spots. The spore print is pale yellowish or cream-colored. When cut, this mushroom sometimes produces small amounts of orange latex that stains greenish.

== Habitat and ecology ==
Lactarius aestivus
- Mycological characteristics
- Gills on hymenium
- Cap is convex
- Stipe is bare
- Spore print is cream to yellow
- Ecology is mycorrhizal
- Edibility is edible or choice

Lactarius aestivus is found under fir and hemlock trees. It is mycorrhizal. It fruits from late summer until fall, and sometimes into winter.

== Edibility ==
Lactarius aestivus is considered edible. It is considered to be less grainy in texture than its relatives, and one source even considers it choice.
