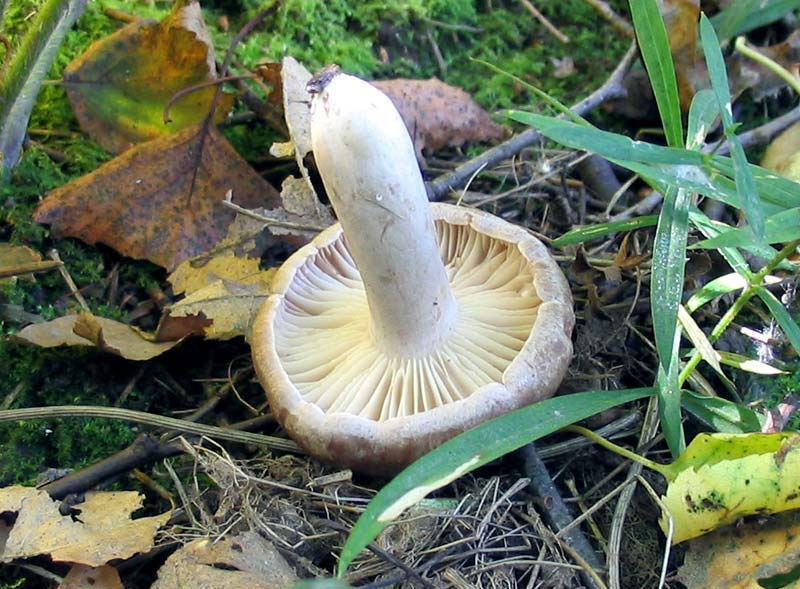
- The gills of L. flexuosus

Scientific classification
- Domain: Eukaryota
- Kingdom: Fungi
- Division: Basidiomycota
- Class: Agaricomycetes
- Order: Russulales
- Family: Russulaceae
- Genus: Lactarius
- Species: L. flexuosus

Binomial name
- Lactarius flexuosus (Pers.) Gray (1821)

Synonyms
- Agaricus lactifluus [unranked] flexuosus Pers. (1801)

= Lactarius flexuosus =

Species of fungus

Lactarius flexuosus is a species of fungus in the mushroom family Russulaceae. The cap of L. flexuosus can reach 10 cm (3.9 in) in diameter. The mushroom is edible when pickled and boiled.
