= Lactarius occidentalis =

Scientific classification
- Kingdom: Fungi
- Division: Basidiomycota
- Class: Agaricomycetes
- Order: Russulales
- Family: Russulaceae
- Genus: Lactarius
- Species: L. occidentalis

Binomial name
- Lactarius occidentalis A.H. Sm.

Species of fungus

Lactarius occidentalis is a species of mushroom in the family Russulaceae. Its range extends from Alaska to Northern California.

== Description ==
The cap of Lactarius occidentalis ranges in color from olive to cinnamon, and is about 1-3 centimeters in diameter. It starts out convex and becomes flat and eventually depressed as the mushroom gets older. The gills are tan or orangish in color. They are adnate. The stipe is olive or orangish and about 2-6 centimeters long and 4-7 millimeters wide. The spore print is white. This mushroom produces small amounts of white latex that dries yellowish.

== Habitat and ecology ==
Lactarius occidentalis is found under alder trees. It is mycorrhizal and fruits from late summer until fall.
