= Burton Orange Longyear =

American botanist (1868–1969)

- Born: July 16, 1868; Leslie, Michigan
- Died: April 15, 1969 (aged 100); Phoenix, Arizona
- Scientific career
- Fields: botany; forestry; mycology
- Author abbrev. (botany): Longyear

Burton Orange Longyear (1868–1969) was an American botanist, forester, and mycologist, specializing in the fungi of Michigan. He was also a gem cutter.

== Biography ==
Born on a farm in Ingham County, Michigan, Burton Longyear moved, at the age of 18, with his parents and brother to Mason, Michigan, the county seat of Ingham County. He clerked in a pharmacy owned by his brother and eventually became a registered pharmacist. In 1890 he enrolled to study botany and chemistry at the State Agricultural College of Michigan, which was renamed Michigan Agricultural College in 1909 and Michigan State University in 1964. At the State Agricultural College, he became in 1893 an instructor of botany and later was employed there for two years as United States Experiment Station Botanist. As a special student at the State Agricultural College, he graduated with a Bachelor of Science degree in 1903.

In 1904 he became an instructor in botany and horticulture at Colorado Agricultural College (CAC), which was renamed Colorado State College of Agriculture and Mechanic Arts in 1935 and Colorado State University in 1957. In 1909 he became head of the newly established department of botany and forestry at CAC. From 1912 to 1915 he served as State Forester of Colorado (a newly created position) but then returned to teaching botany. At CAC he became am associate professor of forestry and held that position until he retired in 1936. He received a master's degree in forestry from Michigan State College in 1925. During his career he published many bulletins and articles.

On 29 December 1897 Burton O. Longyear married Jessie L. Bond (1870–1953). They had several children.

== Selected publications ==
=== Bulletins ===
- Michigan Mushrooms. Bulletin / Michigan Agricultural Experiment Station; 208. Vol. Bulletin 208. Michigan State Agricultural College Experiment Station. April 1903.
- A New Apple Rot. Bulletin; 105. Vol. Bulletin 105. The Agricultural Experiment Station of the Colorado Agricultural College. November 1905.
- The Evergreen Trees of Colorado. Bulletin / Agricultural Experiment Station of the Colorado Agricultural College; 130. Vol. Bulletin 130. The Agricultural Experiment Station of the Colorado Agricultural College. May 1908.
- Some Mushrooms of Colorado. Bulletin; 201. Vol. Bulletin 201. The Agricultural Experiment Station of the Colorado Agricultural College. November 1914.
- The Dandelion in Colorado. Bulletin; 236. Vol. Bulletin 236. The Agricultural Experiment Station of the Colorado Agricultural College. January 1918.

=== Books ===
- Rocky Mountain Wild Flower Studies. Merchants Publishing Co. 1909.
- Trees and Shrubs of the Rocky Mountain Region. G. P. Putnam & Sons. 1927.
