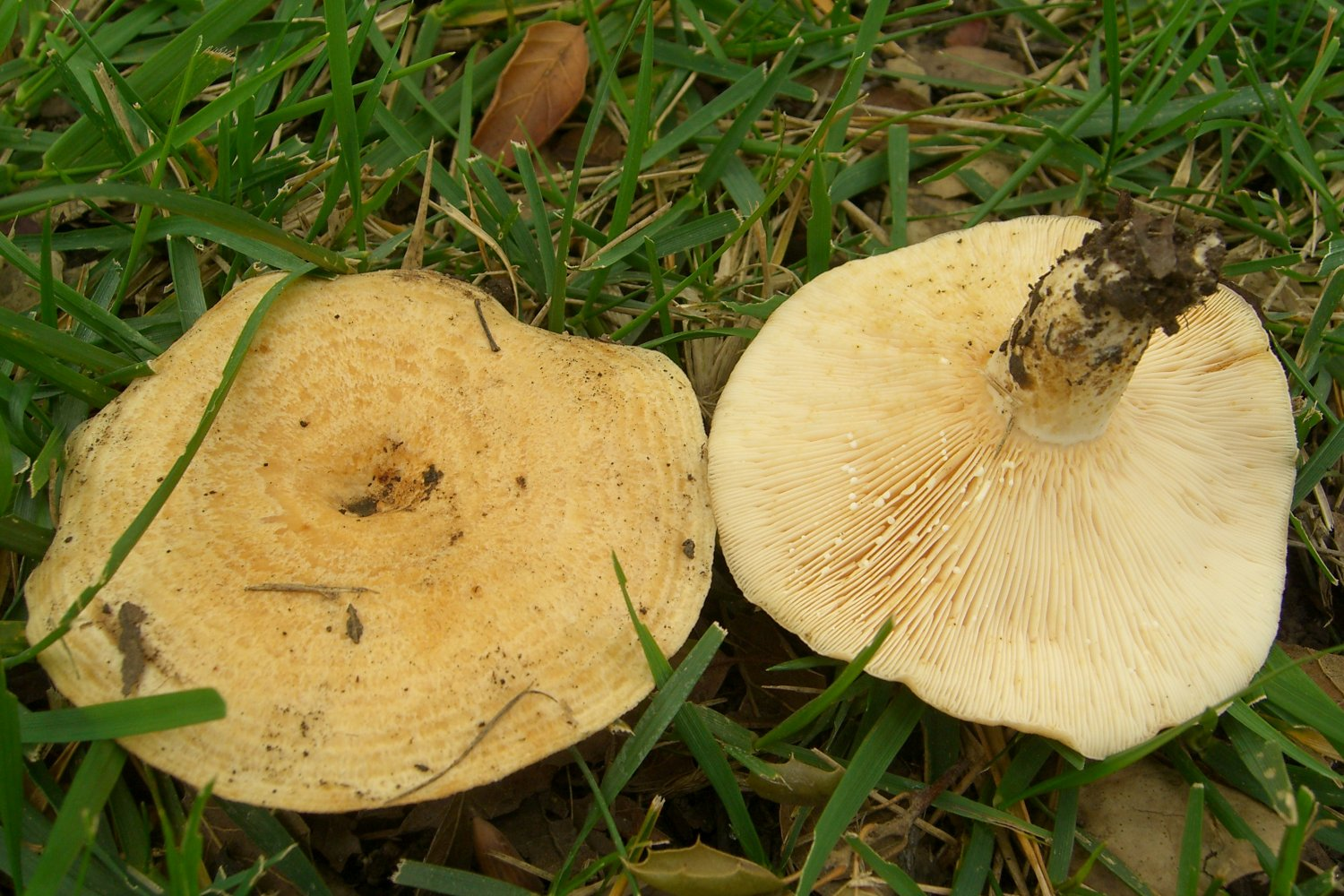

Scientific classification
- Kingdom: Fungi
- Division: Basidiomycota
- Class: Agaricomycetes
- Order: Russulales
- Family: Russulaceae
- Genus: Lactarius
- Species: L. alnicola

Binomial name
- Lactarius alnicola A.H.Sm. (1960)

= Lactarius alnicola =

Species of fungus

Lactarius alnicola
- Mycological characteristics
- Gills on hymenium
- Cap is depressed
- Hymenium is adnate or decurrent
- Stipe is bare
- Spore print is white to yellow
- Ecology is mycorrhizal
- Edibility is not recommended

Lactarius alnicola, commonly known as the golden milkcap, is a species of fungus in the family Russulaceae. The fruit bodies produced by the fungus are characterized by a sticky, vanilla-colored cap up to 20 cm (8 in) wide with a mixture of yellow tones arranged in faint concentric bands. The stem is up to 5 cm (2 in) long and has yellow-brown spots. When it is cut or injured, the mushroom oozes a white latex, which has an intensely peppery taste. The acrid taste of the fruit bodies renders them unpalatable. Two varieties have been named: var. pitkinensis, known from Colorado, and var. pungens, from Michigan.

The fungus is found in the western United States and Mexico, where it grows in mycorrhizal associations with various coniferous trees species, such as spruce, pine and fir, and deciduous species such as oak and alder. It has also been collected in India.

== Taxonomy ==
The species was originally described by American mycologist Alexander H. Smith in 1960, from a collection made near Warm Lake, Idaho, two years prior. The species was originally collected under alders with conifers nearby, and its specific epithet reflects the presumed association between the species; alnicola means "living with alder". Researchers subsequently discovered that the species has a relationship with conifers, not with alders, as the name implies. The mushroom is commonly known as the "golden milkcap".

Lactarius alnicola is classified in subsection Scrobiculati of section Piperites in the genus Lactarius. Species in this subsection are characterized by having a milk-white to creamy or whey-like latex that soon turns yellow upon exposure to air, and which may stain freshly cut surfaces of the fruit body yellow. Further, the cap margin is bearded, strigose (covered with sharp, straight, and stiff hairs), and coarsely tomentose or woolly when young. Other species in the subsection include L. subpaludosus, L. delicatus, L. torminosus, L. payettensis, L. gossypinus, L. pubescens, L. resimus and L. scrobiculatus (the type species of the subsection).

== Description ==
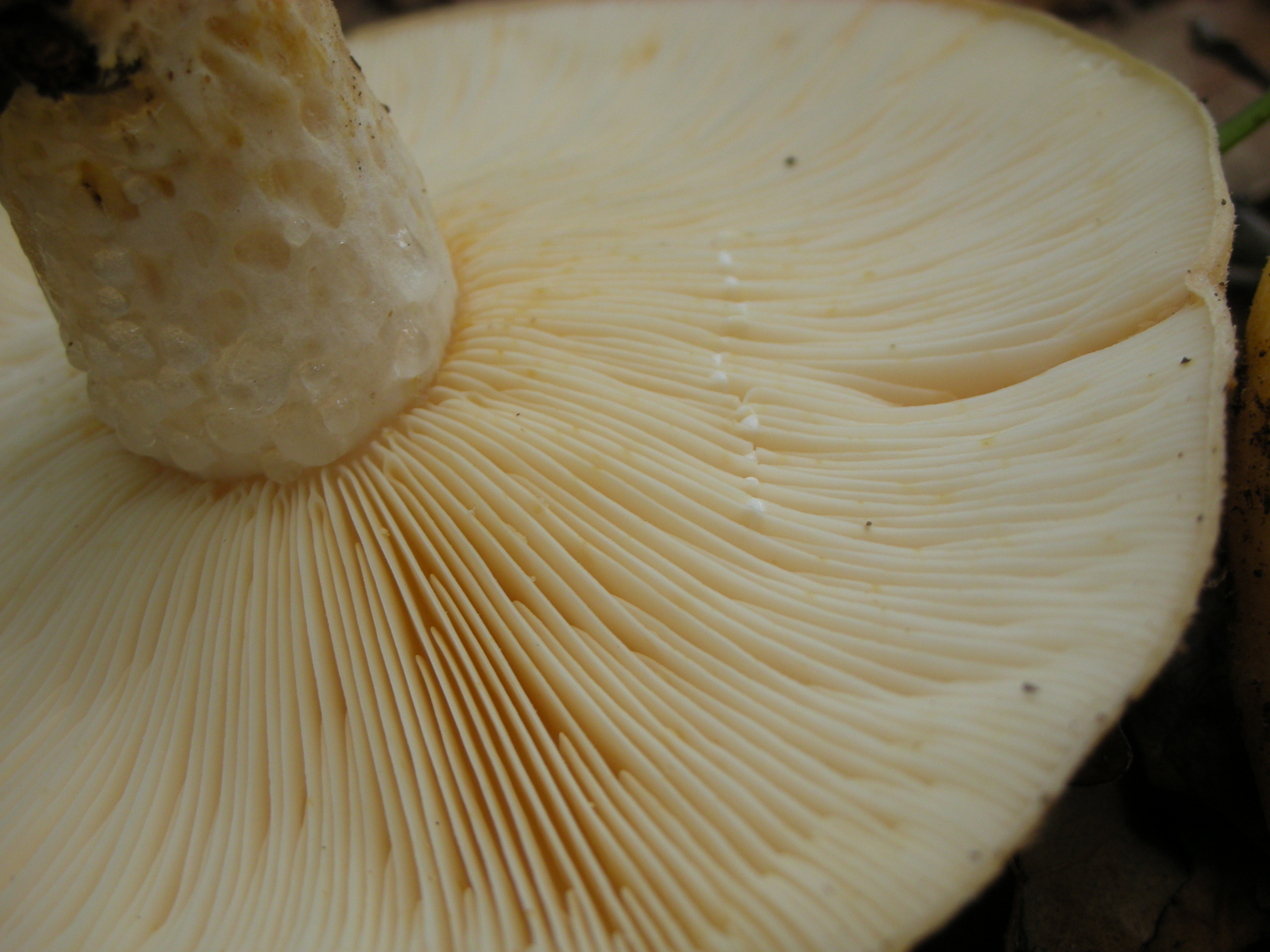
The gills are forked near the stem.

The cap is 6–20 cm (2 1/2–8 in) wide, initially convex but becoming depressed to funnel-shaped in maturity. The cap margin is initially rolled inward, then becomes uplifted as the cap expands. The cap surface is sticky to slimy, and near the margin there are matted "hairs" beneath the slimy or sticky layer. The color of the cap surface is yellow-ochre, sometimes with concentric bands of lighter and darker shades; the color becomes paler near the margin. The gills are adnate (squarely attached to the stem) to decurrent (attached to and running down the length of the stem), narrow, and crowded closely together. Forked near the stem, the gills are initially whitish before becoming pale ochraceous-buff. There are many lamellulae—small gills that do not extend completely to the stem.

The stem is 3–6 cm (1 1/4–2 1/4 in) long and 2–3 cm (3/4–1 1/4 in) thick, nearly equal in width throughout or tapered downward, dry, hard, coarsely pitted, and whitish to cream yellowish. It is initially solid, then becomes hollow with age. The flesh is thick, hard, whitish, and slowly stains pale yellow after the mushroom has been cut open. It has no distinctive odor, while the taste is immediately acrid. The latex is sparse, white on exposure to air, and unchanging or very slowly changing color to yellow. It stains cut flesh yellow, and tastes acrid. According to mycologist David Arora, the oak-loving central and southern Californian population of this species has a more latent acrid taste. The spore print may range slightly in color: thin deposits are white, thick deposits are more yellow. The mushroom is considered inedible because of the intensely peppery taste.

=== Microscopic characters ===
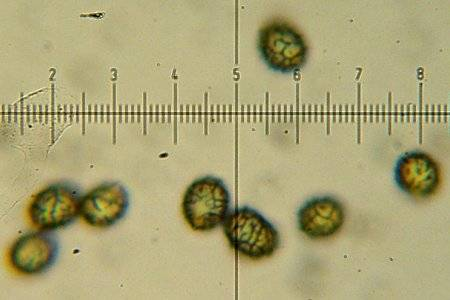
Spores of L. alnicola, viewed at 1000x; 10 divisions equal 9.75 μm.

The spores are 7.5–10 by 6–8.5 μm, ellipsoid, and ornamented with warts and narrow bands that form a partial reticulum. The surface prominences are up to 1 μm high, but mostly in the range 0.3–0.6 μm. The spores are hyaline (translucent) and amyloid, meaning that they will adsorb iodine when stained with Melzer's reagent. The basidia, the spore-bearing cells, are four-spored, and measure 37–48 by 8–11 μm. The cap cuticle is an ixocutis (a tissue layer on the surface of a mushroom made of a layer of gelatinous hyphae) made of encrusted hyphae that are 3–5 μm wide.

=== Varieties ===
In their 1979 monograph of North American Lactarius species, Hesler and Smith named two varieties of L. alnicola. Lactarius alnicola var. pitkinensis, reported under mixed aspen and conifers from Ashcroft, Colorado, is very similar to the nominate variety, but it has a white to cream-colored cap and white, unchanging latex. It has slightly smaller fruit bodies, with caps up to 10 cm (4 in) wide, and stems up to 4 cm (1 1/2 in) long; its spores are slightly larger, measuring 9–10.5 by 7.5–9 μm. Lactarius alnicola var. pungens, reported only from mixed forests in Michigan, is similar but has a tacky surface that soon dries, a dull ochraceous to ochraceous-tan cap with an ochraceous-tawny center. It has whitish flesh, with a pungent odor described as "distinct and peculiar".

=== Similar species ===
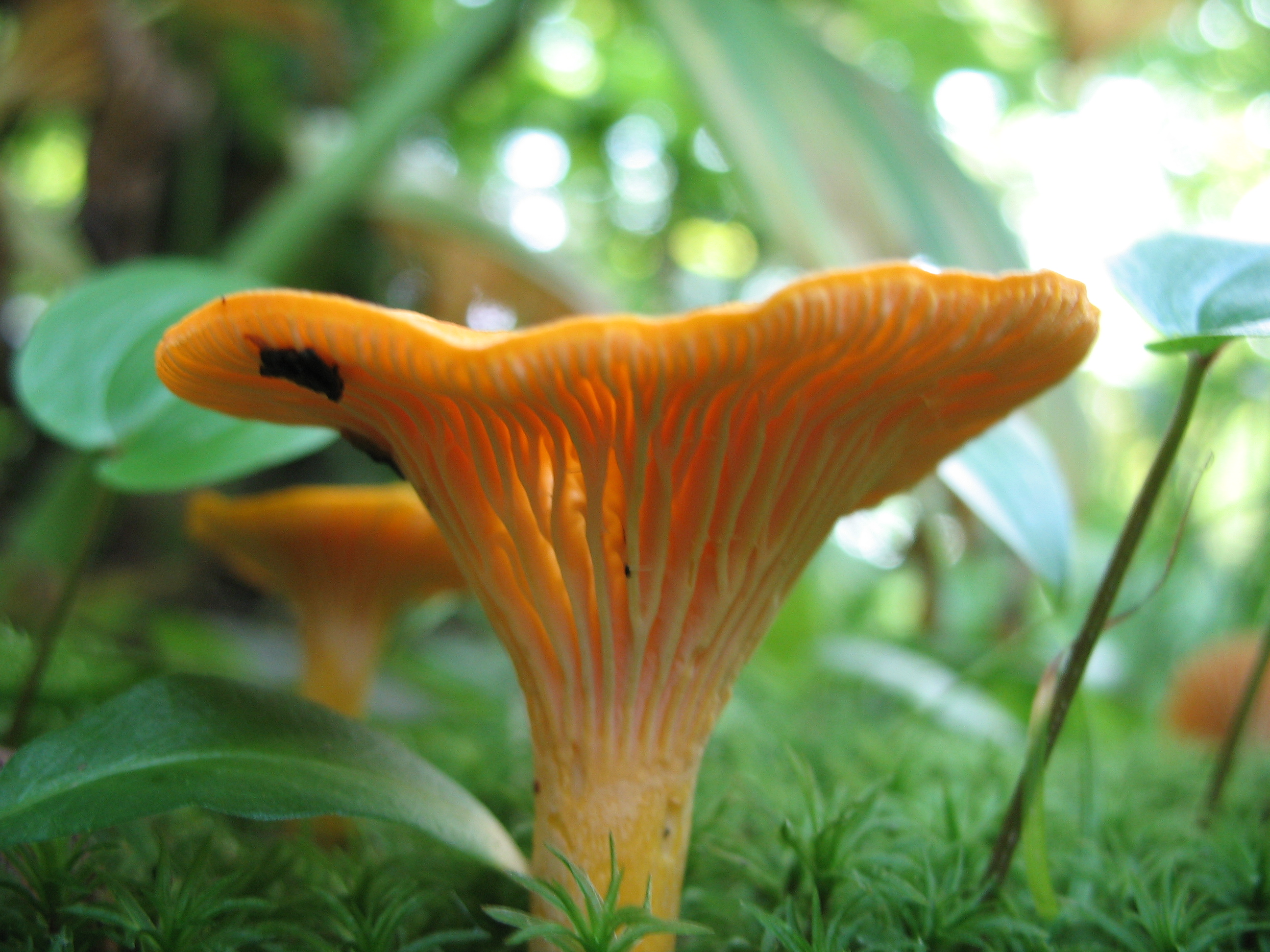
Cantharellus cibarius

Novice mushroom hunters may mistake L. alnicola for the edible species Cantharellus cibarius, which has a vase-shaped fruit body with strongly decurrent gills. Other similar Lactarius species include L. zonarius, L. payettensis, L. yazooensis, L. olympianus, and L. psammicola f. glaber.

L. olympianus associates with conifers and has a pale yellow-ochre, frequently zonate cap, but may be distinguished by its stem, which is usually covered with spots. L. payettensis has a roughened, not smooth, cap margin. L. yazooensis has a zonate cap and extremely acrid flesh. Its gills change color from pale vinaceous to light pinkish-brown in maturity. L. psammicola f. glaber has a pinkish-buff spore print. Mature fruit bodies of L. scrobiculatus var. montanus have been confused with L. alnicola. Its fruit bodies feature a smooth cap margin, acrid taste, white latex which slowly (over several minutes) turns yellow on exposure or stains the flesh yellow, and do not turn "clay color" when bruised.

== Ecology, habitat, and distribution ==
Lactarius alnicola is an ectomycorrhizal species, and engages in a mutualistic association with certain plant species. In this association, the hyphae of the fungus permeate large volumes of soil and obtain scarce elements, especially phosphorus—which is often limiting for plant growth—which they pass on to the plant in exchange for metabolic products of the plant's photosynthesis. The ectomycorrhizae that the fungus forms in association with Picea engelmannii have been shown to contain lactifers (latex-producing cells) and pigments similar to the fruit body. Fruit bodies of the fungus grow in groups on the ground under alders and conifers, usually appearing between July and October.

It is a fairly common species in the western United States and Baja California. Additional collection locations in Mexico include Veracruz, Villarreal, and Tapia. A population in central and southern California is known to associate with oak trees. In the Rocky Mountains it is associated with the subalpine tree species Engelmann Spruce (Picea engelmannii), while at lower elevations it is commonly found with white spruce (Picea glauca). It is also known to associate with Ponderosa Pine (Pinus ponderosa) and Douglas-fir (genus Pseudotsuga). The mushroom has also been collected from Bageshwar, in the state of Uttarakhand, India.

== See also ==
- List of Lactarius species
