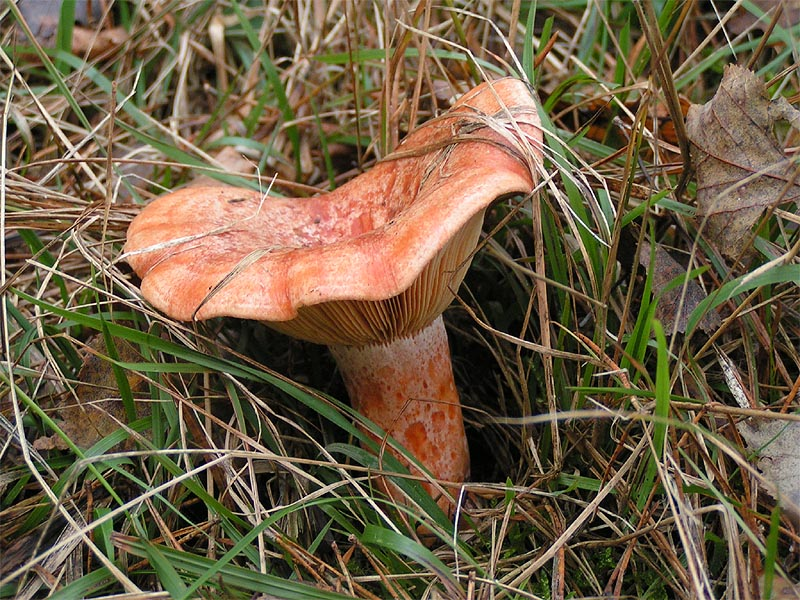

Scientific classification
- Kingdom: Fungi
- Division: Basidiomycota
- Class: Agaricomycetes
- Order: Russulales
- Family: Russulaceae
- Genus: Lactarius
- Species: L. deliciosus

Binomial name
- Lactarius deliciosus (L. ex Fr.) S.F.Gray (1821)

Synonyms
- Agaricus deliciosus L. (1753); Galorrheus deliciosus (L.) P.Kumm. (1871); Lactifluus deliciosus (L.) Kuntze (1891)

= Lactarius deliciosus =

Species of fungus

Lactarius deliciosus
- Mycological characteristics
- Gills on hymenium
- Cap is depressed
- Hymenium is decurrent
- Stipe is bare
- Spore print is tan
- Ecology is mycorrhizal
- Edibility is choice

Lactarius deliciosus, commonly known as the delicious milk cap, saffron milk cap, or red pine mushroom, is one of the best-known members of the large milk-cap genus Lactarius in the order Russulales. It is native to Europe, but has been accidentally introduced to other regions along with pine trees, with which the fungus is symbiotic.

== Taxonomy ==
The species was known to Carl Linnaeus, who officially described it in the second volume of his Species Plantarum in 1753, giving it the name Agaricus deliciosus. The specific epithet is derived from Latin deliciosus, meaning "tasty". The Swedish taxonomist allegedly gave the species its epithet after smelling it and presuming it tasted good, perhaps confusing it with a Mediterranean milk cap regarded for its flavor. Dutch mycologist Christian Hendrik Persoon added the varietal epithet lactifluus in 1801, before English mycologist Samuel Frederick Gray placed it in its current genus, Lactarius, in 1821 in his The Natural Arrangement of British Plants.

It is commonly known as saffron milk-cap, red pine mushroom, or simply pine mushroom in English. An alternative North American name is orange latex milky. Its Spanish name varies (níscalo, nícalo, robellón...). Its Catalan name is rovelló (pl. rovellons). In the Girona area, it is called a pinetell (in Catalan) because it is collected near wild pine trees; it is typically harvested in October following the late August rains. Both this and L. deterrimus are known as "kanlıca", "çıntar" or "çam melkisi" in Turkey. In Romania, it is known as Rascovi and it can be found in the northern regions in autumn season.

== Description ==
Lactarius deliciosus has a carrot-orange cap that is convex to vase shaped, inrolled when young, 3 to 20 centimetres (1 to 8 inches) across, often with darker orange lines in the form of concentric circles. The cap is sticky and viscid when wet, but is often dry. It has crowded decurrent gills and a squat orange stipe that is often hollow, 2 to 8 cm (1 to 3 in) long and 1 to 2.5 cm (1/2 to 1 in) thick. The flesh and gills stain a deep green color when handled. When fresh, it exudes an orange-red latex that does not change color. The spore print is cream-coloured.

=== Chemistry ===
When grown in liquid culture, the mycelium produces a mixture of fatty acids and various compounds such as chroman-4-one, anofinic acid, 3-hydroxyacetylindole, ergosterol, and cyclic dipeptides.

=== Similar species ===
The mushroom is similar to L. rubrilacteus, which stains blue and exudes a red latex. It also resembles L. olympianus, which has white latex and tastes unpleasant. Additionally, L. thyinos is orange but does not stain greenish, and L. salmoneus has a white cap. It is also morphologically similar to L. quieticolor, which has been found in Pinus plantations in Chile and Brazil.

== Distribution and habitat ==
L. deliciosus grows under conifers on acidic soils and forms a mycorrhizal relationship with its host tree. It is native to the southern Pyrenees where it grows under Mediterranean pines, as well as throughout the Mediterranean basin in Portugal, Bulgaria, Spain, Greece, Italy, Cyprus, France and elsewhere. Both this fungus and L. deterrimus are collected and sold in the İzmir Province of southwestern Turkey, and the Antalya Province of the south coast. In the island of Cyprus, large numbers of L. deliciosus are found in the high altitude Pinus nigra and P. brutia forests of the Troodos mountain range, where locals hunt them with vigour, as this fungus is highly esteemed among the local delicacies.

After analysing DNA from collections around the world, mycologists Jorinde Nuytinck, Annemieke Verbeken, and Steve Miller have concluded that L. deliciosus is a distinct European species that differs genetically, morphologically, and ecologically from populations in North America or Central America. It has been reportedly introduced to Chile, Australia and New Zealand, where it grows in Pinus radiata plantations. The species has also been introduced to South Africa. In Australia, popular places for collecting this mushroom, especially among the Polish community, are around Macedon in Victoria, Mount Crawford in the Adelaide Hills and in the Oberon area in New South Wales, Australia, where they can grow to the size of a dinner plate, and in the pine forests of the Australian Capital Territory. Many people of Italian, Polish, Ukrainian and other eastern European ancestry in the states of Victoria and New South Wales, Australia travel to collect these mushrooms after autumn rainfall around Easter time.

Pine plantations and Siberian pine forests are favourable habitats for this species.

It can also be found in Argentina ("níscalo"), Chile ("callampa rosada") and Uruguay ("hongo delicioso", or "hongo catalán").

== Uses ==
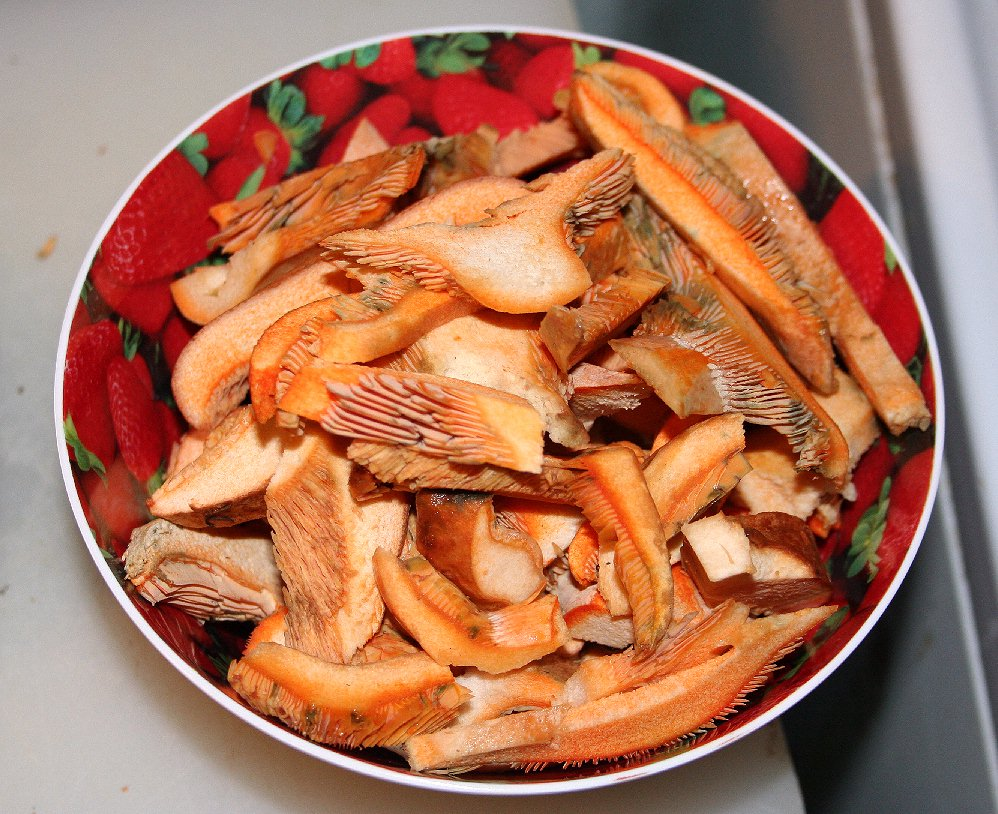
Sliced milk-caps, with the orange latex visible

L. deliciosus is an edible mushroom, but may taste mild or bitter; its misleading epithet, deliciosus ('delicious'), may have been caused by Linnaeus mistaking it for another species. The mushrooms are collected from August to early October, in the Northern Hemisphere and April to June in the Southern Hemisphere. Traditionally being salted or pickled. High consumption of the species may cause urine to discolor to orange or red.

It is widely collected in the Iberian Peninsula. It is used in Spanish cuisine. One recipe recommends they should be lightly washed, fried whole cap down in olive oil with a small amount of garlic and served drenched in raw olive oil and parsley. Only a very small amount of butter is recommended in the pan.

Further north and east it is a feature of Provençal cuisine. They are also collected in Poland, where they are traditionally served fried in butter, with cream, or marinated. In Cyprus, saffron milk caps are usually grilled on the charcoal and then dressed in olive oil and lemon or bitter orange, they are sauteed with onions, or sometimes stewed with onions, coriander and red wine. These mushrooms are very popular in Russian cuisine, where they are traditionally preserved by salting.

In India, the fungus is one of the ten most widely consumed mushrooms by indigenous tribes of Meghalaya.

== Culture ==
A fresco in the Roman town of Herculaneum appears to depict L. deliciosus and is one of the earliest pieces of art to illustrate a fungus.

== See also ==
- List of Lactarius species
