= Lactarius subbaliophaeus =

Scientific classification
- Domain: Eukaryota
- Kingdom: Fungi
- Division: Basidiomycota
- Class: Agaricomycetes
- Order: Russulales
- Family: Russulaceae
- Genus: Lactarius
- Species: L. subbaliophaeus

Binomial name
- Lactarius subbaliophaeus Maba & Yorou (2014)

Species of fungus

Lactarius subbaliophaeus is a member of the large milk-cap genus Lactarius in the order Russulales. Found in Togo, it was described as new to science in 2014 by Dao Lamèga Maba and Nourou Yorou. It is named for its similarity to the more widespread African species L. baliophaeus. L. subbaliophaeus produces a white latex which, upon exposure to air, changes color to pinkish and then blackish.

== See also ==
- List of Lactarius species
