= Necatorine =

Necatorine may refer to:

- A brand name for a pharmacuetical formulation of carbon tetrachloride, once used as an antiparasitic agent
- An alternative spelling of necatorin, a mutagenic chemical compound found in mushrooms
