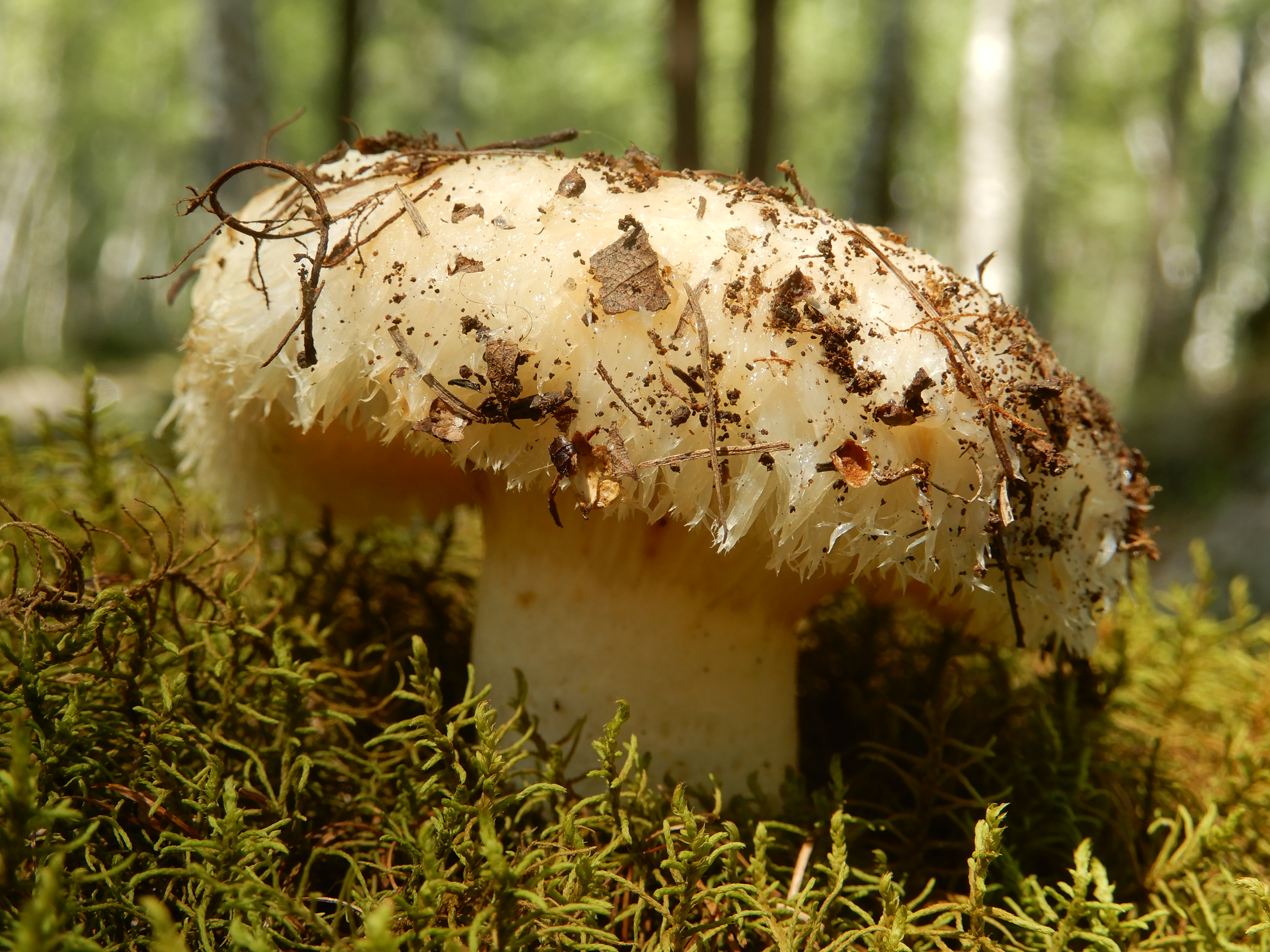

Scientific classification
- Kingdom: Fungi
- Division: Basidiomycota
- Class: Agaricomycetes
- Order: Russulales
- Family: Russulaceae
- Genus: Lactarius
- Species: L. resimus

Binomial name
- Lactarius resimus (Fr.) Fr. (1838)

Synonyms
- Agaricus resimus Fr. (1821); Galorrheus resimus (Fr.) P.Kumm. (1871); Lactifluus resimus (Fr.) Kuntze (1891)

= Lactarius resimus =

Species of fungus

Lactarius resimus is a species of mushrooms in the genus Lactarius, which is considered a delicacy in Russia and some other countries of Eastern Europe when pickled in salt. There it is considered one of three tastiest edible mushrooms, along with Boletus edulis and Lactarius deliciosus. However, the raw form is considered mildly toxic because of its acrid latex. The mushroom forms a mycorrhizal relationship with birch and with conifers too (pine). They are commonly found in northern and eastern Europe including Russia, Belarus, Ukraine, the Baltic states and parts of Scandinavia. They typically grow on acidic soil and appear in late summer to autumn.

The cap ranges from 4 to 15 cm (1.6 to 5.9 in) in diameter. The stalk ranges from 2 to 6 cm (0.79 to 2.36 in) in length and 1 to 3 cm (0.39 to 1.18 in) in width. The mushroom is generally white, but stains yellow to orange. The spores are white-yellow, elliptical and bumpy.

Similar species include Lactarius pubescens var. betulae and Lactarius torminosus.

== See also ==
- List of Lactarius species
