= Lactarius baliophaeus =

Scientific classification
- Domain: Eukaryota
- Kingdom: Fungi
- Division: Basidiomycota
- Class: Agaricomycetes
- Order: Russulales
- Family: Russulaceae
- Genus: Lactarius
- Species: L. baliophaeus

Binomial name
- Lactarius baliophaeus Pegler (1969)

Species of fungus

Lactarius baliophaeus is a member of the large milk-cap genus Lactarius in the order Russulales. Described as new to science by mycologist David Pegler in 1969, the species is found in Ghana, Benin, and Zambia. Fruitbodies of the type collection were found growing in the ground under Cassia. It is closely related to Lactarius subbaliophaeus, a species described from Togo in 2014. Both are classified in Lactarius section Nigrescentes. L. baliophaeus is edible and used as food.

== See also ==
- List of Lactarius species
