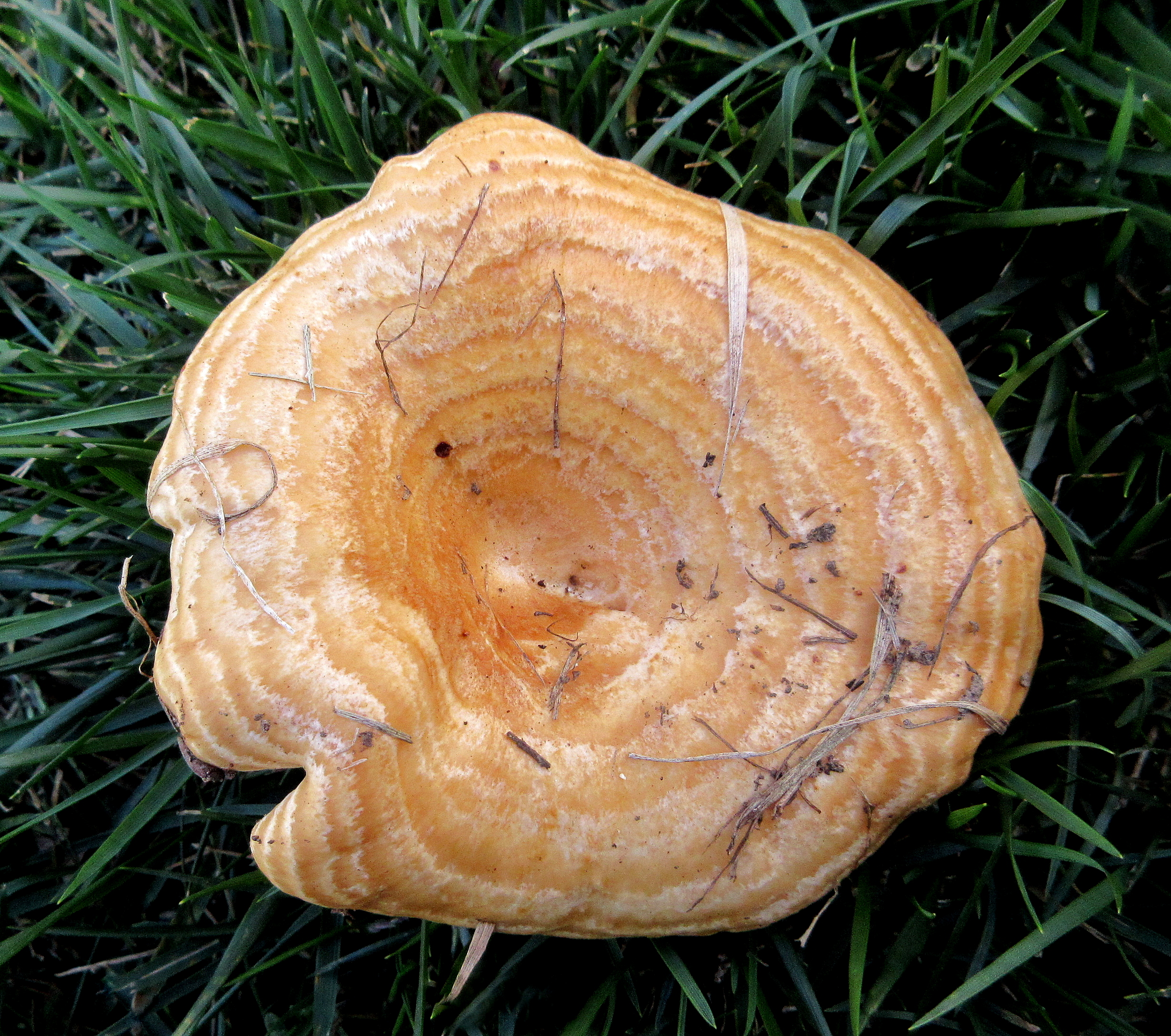

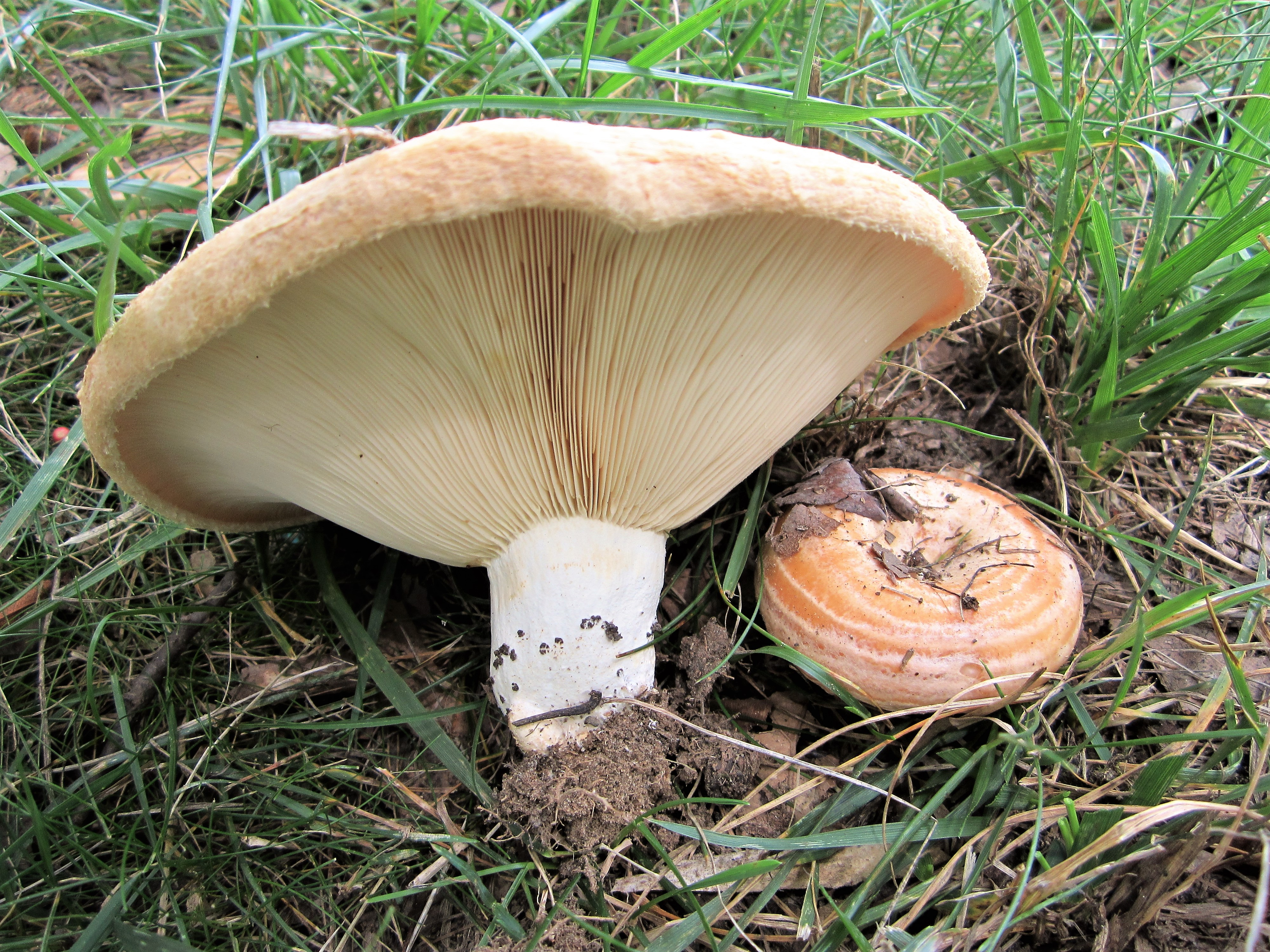

Scientific classification
- Domain: Eukaryota
- Kingdom: Fungi
- Division: Basidiomycota
- Class: Agaricomycetes
- Order: Russulales
- Family: Russulaceae
- Genus: Lactarius
- Species: L. psammicola

Binomial name
- Lactarius psammicola A.H.Sm.

= Lactarius psammicola =

Species of fungus

Lactarius psammicola is a species of mushroom in the genus Lactarius, family Russulaceae, and order Russulales. Its mushroom cap is convex when young and becomes funnel shaped as it ages. The cap has concentric rings of orangish brown. The taste is described as acrid.
