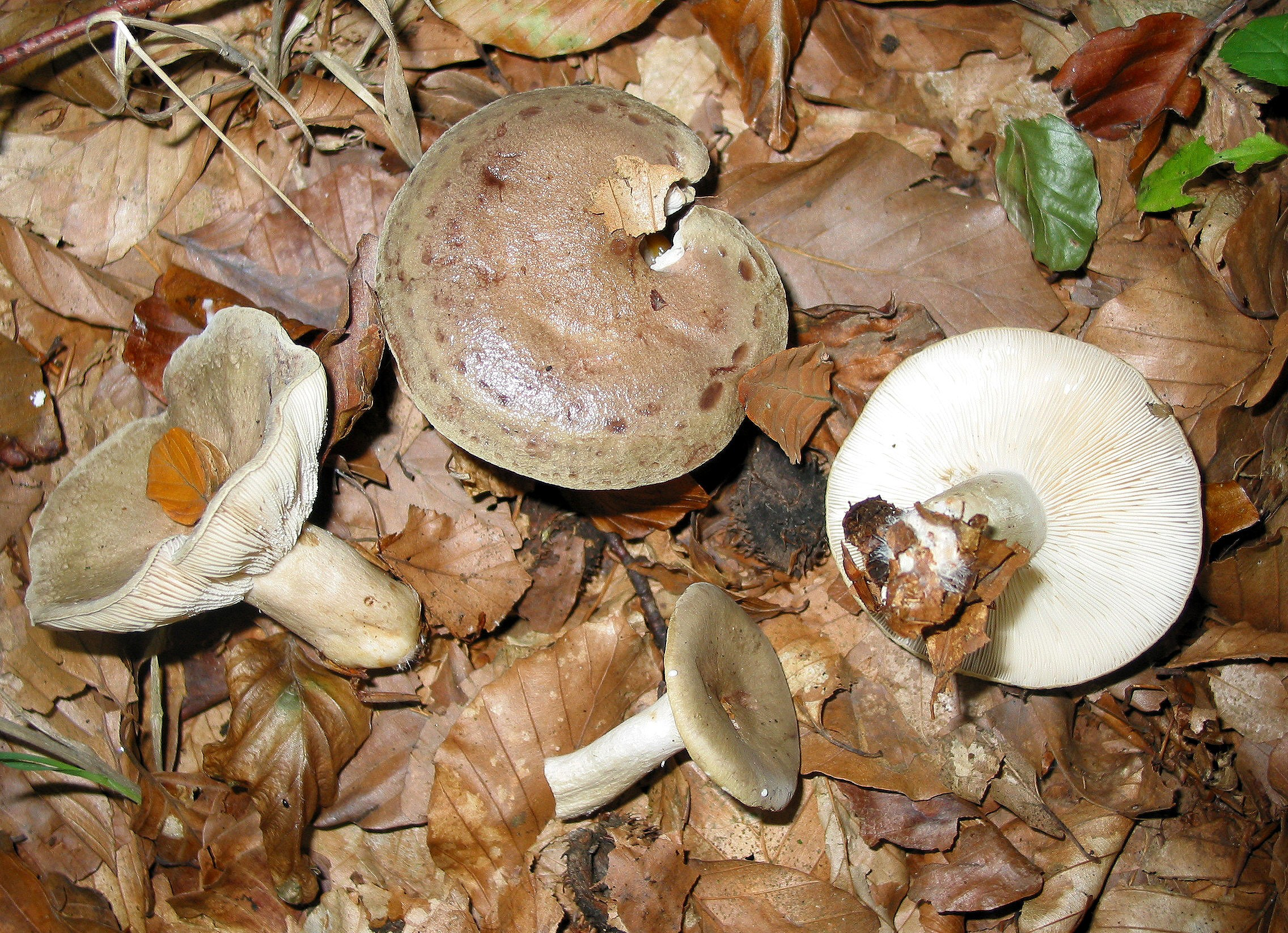

Scientific classification
- Kingdom: Fungi
- Division: Basidiomycota
- Class: Agaricomycetes
- Order: Russulales
- Family: Russulaceae
- Genus: Lactarius
- Species: L. blennius

Binomial name
- Lactarius blennius (Fr.) Fr. (1838)

Synonyms
- List: Agaricus blennius Fr. (1815); Galorrheus blennius (Fr.: Fr.) Fr. (1825); Lactifluus blennius (Fr.: Fr.) Kuntze (1891); Lactarius blennius f. virescens Lange (1940); Agaricus viridis Schrad. (1794); Lactarius viridis (Schrad.) Quél. (1886); Lactarius blennius var. viridis (Schrad.) Quél. (1881)

= Lactarius blennius =

Species of fungus

Lactarius blennius
- Mycological characteristics
- Gills on hymenium
- Cap is convex
- Hymenium is decurrent or adnate
- Stipe is bare
- Spore print is cream
- Ecology is mycorrhizal
- Edibility is inedible

Lactarius blennius (commonly known as the slimy milkcap or beech milkcap) is a medium-sized mushroom of the genus Lactarius found commonly in beech forests in Europe, where it is mycorrhizal, favouring the European beech (though associations with other trees are known). It was first described by Elias Magnus Fries. Though its colour and size vary, it is distinctive because it is slimy when wet and exudes copious amounts of milk. It has been the subject of some chemical research, and it can be used to produce pigments and blennins. Blennins, some of which have shown potential medical application, are derived from lactarane, a chemical so named because of their association with Lactarius. The edibility of L. blennius is uncertain, with different mycologists suggesting that it is edible (though not recommended), inedible or even poisonous.

== Taxonomy and naming ==
Lactarius blennius was first described by Swedish mycologist Elias Magnus Fries as Agaricus blennius in 1815, before being given its current binomial name by the same author in 1838. Within the genus Lactarius, it is closely related to Lactarius cinereus, another Lactarius species that also favours beech. It has been suggested that the two species (forming a group) could have a coevolutionary pathway with beech. The specific epithet is derived from a Latin adjective blennius, meaning "slimy". Lactarius mushrooms are commonly known as milkcaps, and L. blennius is known as the Slimy Milkcap or the Beech Milkcap.

Lactarius blennius is synonymous with Agaricus blennius (the name under which Fries first described the species in 1815) and Agaricus viridis, a name given earlier by Heinrich Schrader, in 1794. Galorrheus blennius (a name proposed in 1871 by Paul Kummer), Lactarius viridis (proposed in 1888 by Lucien Quélet) and Lactifluus blennius (proposed by Otto Kuntze in 1891) are also now recognised as synonyms. Lactarius albidopallens was originally described as a form of L. blennius as Lactarius blennius f. albidopallens by Jakob Emanuel Lange in 1928, before being classified as a separate species by J. Blum. Lange also described Lactarius blennius f. virescens, which is now recognised as nomen invalidum (an invalid name). Lactarius fluens is another species that has been included in L. blennius; originally described in 1899 by Jean Louis Émile Boudier, in 1999, German Joseph Krieglsteiner suggested that it is actually a variety of L. blennius, naming it Lactarius blennius var. fluens. However today L. fluens is normally regarded as a related but separate species, distinguished by a pale cap margin, less sliminess and a deeper cream gill colour. The situation with Lactarius viridis is similar but with a different outcome; it was first described as a separate species by Quélet in 1888, and then in 1980 A. Marchand proposed that it is in fact a variety of L. blennius, naming it Lactarius blennius var. viridis. In this case the synonymy has become accepted.

== Description ==
Lactarius blennius has a flattened convex cap that is 4–10 cm (1.6–4 in) across that later becomes depressed in the centre. In colour, it is pale olive to a greenish grey, sometimes a dull green or pale grey-sepia, and has blotches of darker colouration in concentric bands, though the colour can vary greatly. Heavily spotted specimens are also known, and a very brown specimen similar to Lactarius circellatus was recorded in Scotland. The cap is very slimy when moist and has a margin that is curved inwards. The stem is a paler colour than the cap, but also very slimy, and measures from 4–5 cm (1.6–2 in) tall by 1–1.7 cm (0.4–0.7 in) thick, tapering a little towards the bottom. The flesh is whitish, similar in colour to the gills, which later become a creamy or pale buff colour. The gills turn a brownish-grey colour when wounded, and are crowded. In shape, they are slightly decurrent or adnate, meaning that they run a small way down the stem in attachment, or that they are attached to the stem by the whole depth of the gills. The milk is white and dries grey, and is very plentiful. L. blennius spores leave a creamy print, and are elliptic with low warts joined by ridges with a small number of cross-connections, measuring from 6–9 by 5.5–7 μm.

== Distribution, habitat and ecology ==
Lactarius blennius is very common and is found in broad-leaved woodland, favouring beech; it is most associated with Fagus sylvatica, the European beech, though it has also been observed growing in association with species of oak. It forms an ectomycorrhizal association with trees, and can grow on a wide variety of subsoil types, but is more typical of acidic soil. It is found between late summer and late autumn, and is native to Europe. The distribution of the mushroom coincides with the distribution of beech. In the British Isles, the species is one of the one hundred most common mushrooms. Other areas in which it has been recorded include Sweden, France, Italy, and Poland.

== Uses ==
Mycologist Roger Phillips claims that L. blennius is edible when cooked, but not recommended, while others describe it as inedible or even poisonous. The milk tastes very hot and acrid.

Lactarius blennius has been the subject of some research in chemistry. Lactarane derivatives (known as "blennins") have been acquired from the mushroom, including the lactone blennin D, and blennin A, which was first isolated from this species. Lactaranes are chemicals so named because of their occurrence in Lactarius species. Blennins have been shown to be potentially useful- blennin A, for instance (a lactarane-type sesquiterpene) has been shown to be an anti-inflammatory, having a strong inhibitative affect against leukotriene C_{4} biosynthesis. L. blennius can also be refined to create a green pigment, known as blennione.

== See also ==
- List of Lactarius species
