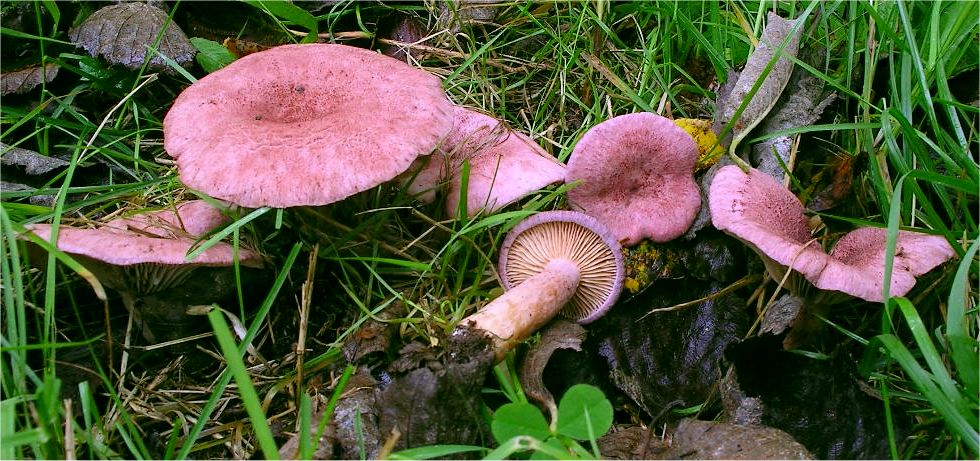

Scientific classification
- Domain: Eukaryota
- Kingdom: Fungi
- Division: Basidiomycota
- Class: Agaricomycetes
- Order: Russulales
- Family: Russulaceae
- Genus: Lactarius
- Species: L. lilacinus

Binomial name
- Lactarius lilacinus (Lasch) Fr. (1838)

Synonyms
- Agaricus lilacinus Lasch (1828); Lactifluus lilacinus (Lasch) Kuntze (1891)

= Lactarius lilacinus =

Species of fungus

Lactarius lilacinus, the lilac milkcap, is a European species of the large milk-cap genus Lactarius in the order Russulales.

The species forms an ectomycorrhizal association with grey and black alder, both in the alder subgenus Alnus. A phylogenetic study has shown that L. lilacinus is one of several species that have specialised on the subgenus Alnus as host plants, whereas the closely related L. lepidotus is restricted to green alder in the subgenus Alnobetula.

== See also ==
- List of Lactarius species
