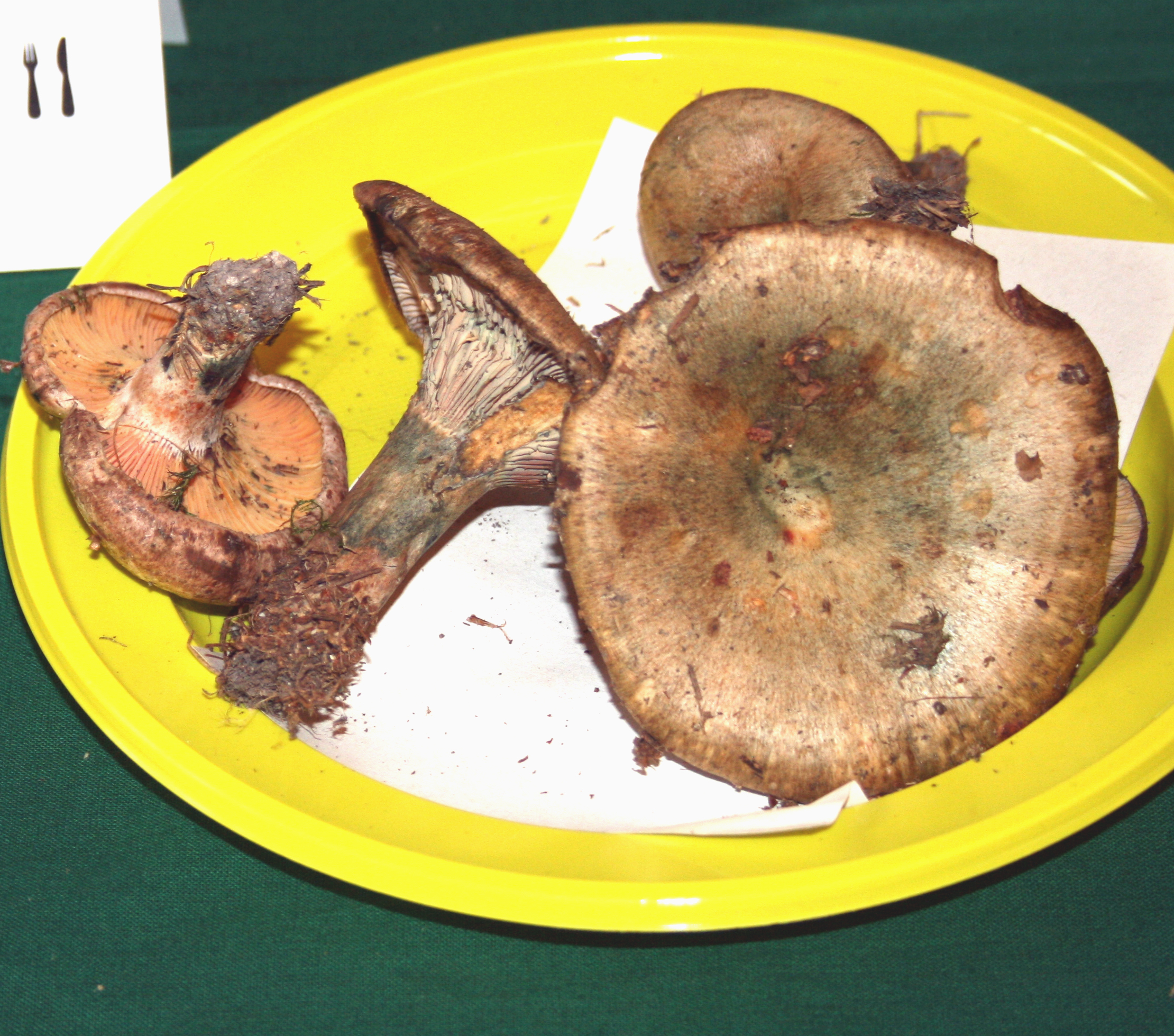

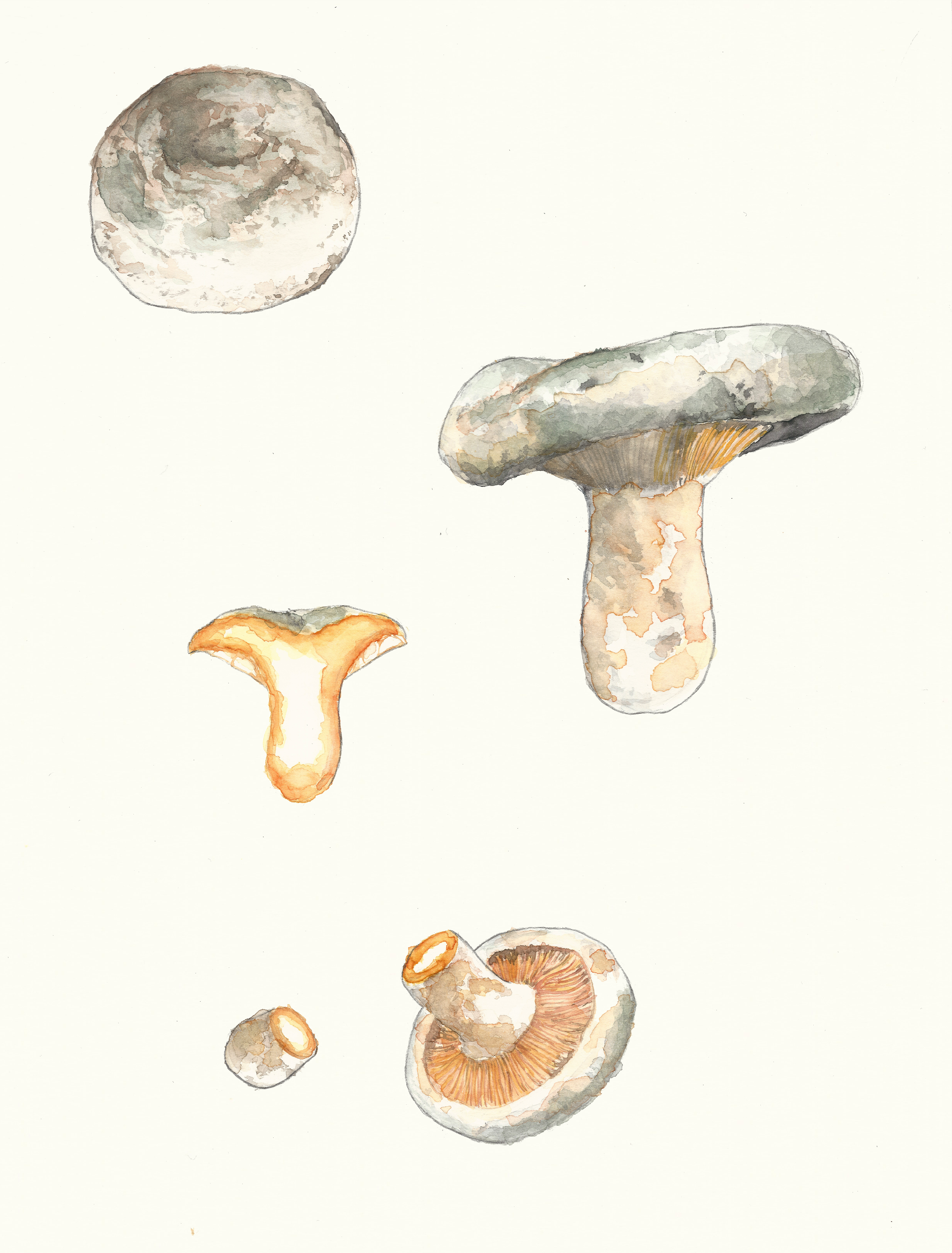

Scientific classification
- Domain: Eukaryota
- Kingdom: Fungi
- Division: Basidiomycota
- Class: Agaricomycetes
- Order: Russulales
- Family: Russulaceae
- Genus: Lactarius
- Species: L. quieticolor

Binomial name
- Lactarius quieticolor Romagn. (1958)

= Lactarius quieticolor =

Species of fungus

Lactarius quieticolor is a member of the large milk-cap genus Lactarius in the order Russulales. It was first described scientifically by French mycologist Henri Romagnesi in 1958.

== See also ==
- List of Lactarius species
