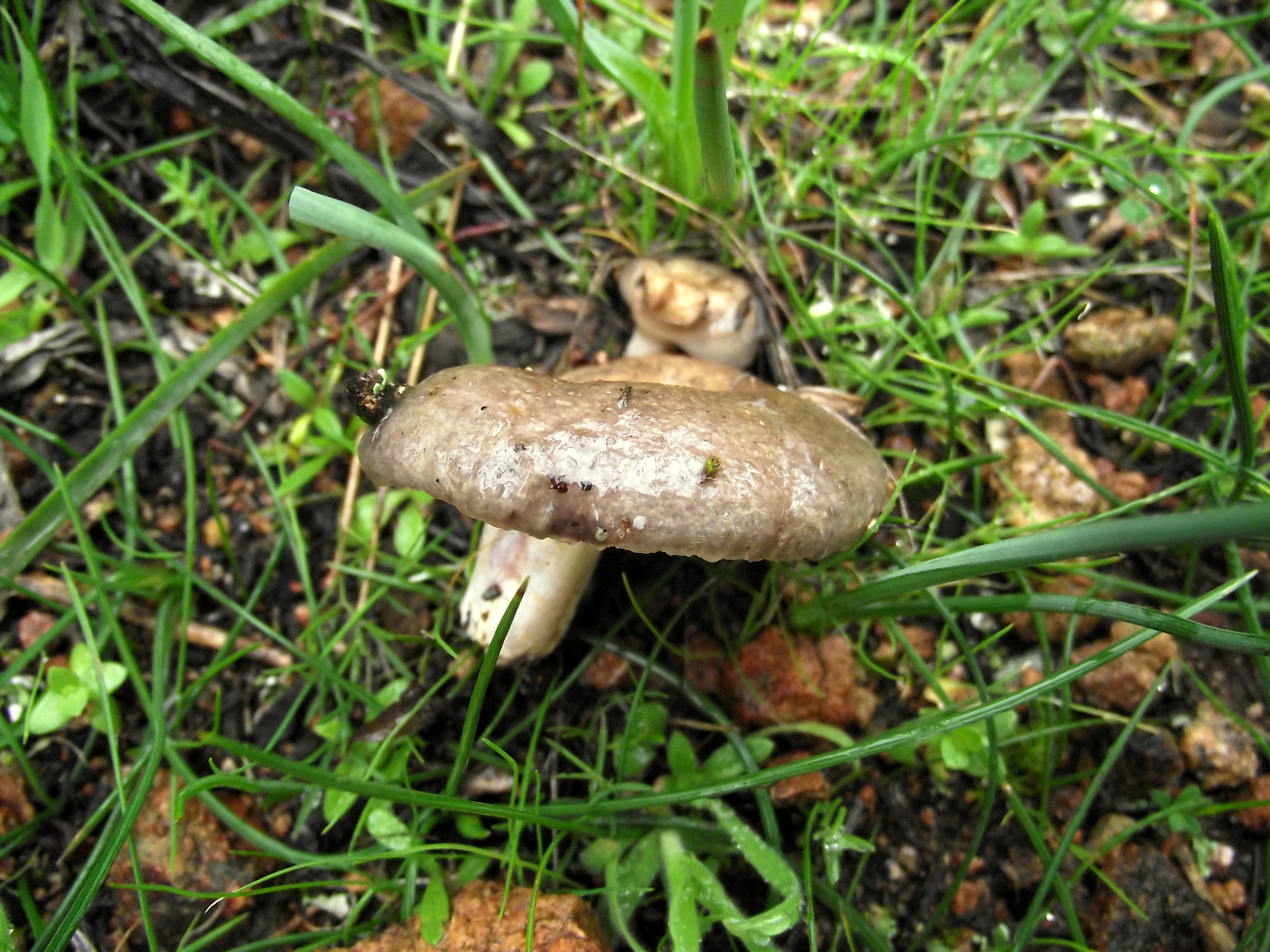

Scientific classification
- Domain: Eukaryota
- Kingdom: Fungi
- Division: Basidiomycota
- Class: Agaricomycetes
- Order: Russulales
- Family: Russulaceae
- Genus: Lactarius
- Species: L. cistophilus

Binomial name
- Lactarius cistophilus Bon & Trimbach (1978)

= Lactarius cistophilus =

Species of mushroom-forming fungus

Lactarius cistophilus is a species of mushroom-forming fungus of the milk-cap genus Lactarius in the family Russulaceae. Found in Mediterranean Europe, it was described as new to science in 1978.

== Taxonomy ==
Lactarius cistophilus was first described as a new species by Marcel Bon and Jacques Trimbach in 1978. The specific epithet cistophilus derives from Greek roots meaning "rockrose‑loving", alluding to its characteristic association with shrubs of the genus Cistus.

== Description ==
Fruit bodies of L. cistophilus are modest in size, with caps 2–5 cm in diameter. The cap is initially convex before flattening and becoming distinctly funnel‑shaped, the margin remaining involute when young. Its surface is finely hairy and somewhat viscid, showing a grey‑violet to dirty brownish‑violet hue that often fades to ochre at the centre with age. The crowded gills (lamellae) are adnate to slightly decurrent, starting pale cream and turning buff. The stipe measures 2–4 cm long by 0.7–1.5 cm wide, is cylindrical to club‑shaped, hollow and silky, white overall but sometimes faintly ochre‑tinted at the base, and bears a delicate, transient white ring. The flesh is white—slightly ochre at the stipe base—with a mild taste and only a faint odour. Under the microscope, spores are amyloid, 7.5––8.5 by 4.5–5.5 μm with an interrupted reticulum, and the gill faces bear large, bottle‑shaped cystidia.

== Habitat and distribution ==
Lactarius cistophilus is known from Mediterranean maquis and garrigue, where it forms ectomycorrhizal partnerships with Cistus shrubs on well‑drained, often siliceous soils. At the time of its original description, it had been recorded primarily in the Provence region of southern France, though Bon suggested that further field surveys in similar western Mediterranean habitats may reveal a broader range. It has since also been reported from Italy, and Spain.

== See also ==
- List of Lactarius species
