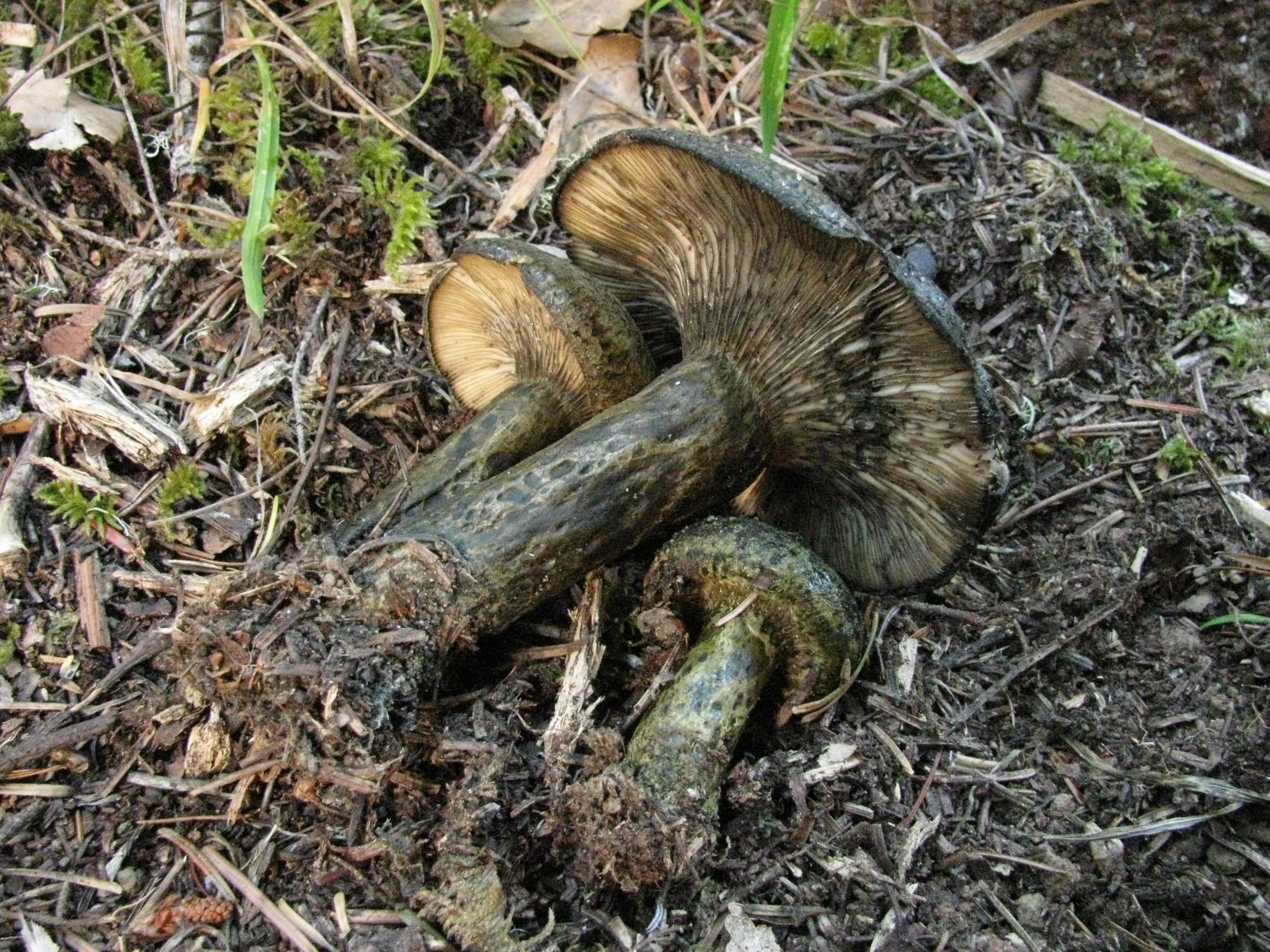

Scientific classification
- Kingdom: Fungi
- Division: Basidiomycota
- Class: Agaricomycetes
- Order: Russulales
- Family: Russulaceae
- Genus: Lactarius
- Species: L. olivaceoumbrinus

Binomial name
- Lactarius olivaceoumbrinus Hesler & A.H. Sm.

= Lactarius olivaceoumbrinus =

Species of fungus

Lactarius olivaceoumbrinus
- Mycological characteristics
- Gills on hymenium
- Cap is convex or depressed
- Hymenium is adnate or decurrent
- Stipe is bare
- Spore print is buff
- Ecology is mycorrhizal
- Edibility is inedible or poisonous

Lactarius olivaceoumbrinus, commonly known as toadskin milk cap, is a species of mushroom in the family Russulaceae. It is found in Northern California, the Pacific Northwest, and Uttarakhand, India.

== Description ==
The cap of Lactarius olivaceoumbrinus is dingy olive green to olive brown, and often has spots. It is about 30-10 centimeters in diameter. At first, it is convex and has an inrolled margin. Then, it flattens out and often becomes depressed. The gills start out pale and become greenish to gray in age. They can be adnate or decurrent. The stipe is olive or brownish in color and about 4-8 centimeters long and 1-3 centimeters wide. It is scrobiculate. The spore print is buff. When cut, this mushroom exudes large amounts of white latex which slowly stains greenish. This mushroom tastes acrid.

Cystidia are present.

== Habitat and distribution ==
Lactarius olivaceoumbrinus is found under conifers. It seems to favor Sitka spruce. It is uncommon. It is known from the Pacific Northwest and Northern California. In 2017, a team of scientists found it in Uttarakhand, India, and confirmed their findings using DNA analysis. The species had never before been recorded from India. The specimens collected in India was morphologically identical to North American material aside from having spores with slightly different proportions.
