= Lactarius chromospermus =

Scientific classification
- Domain: Eukaryota
- Kingdom: Fungi
- Division: Basidiomycota
- Class: Agaricomycetes
- Order: Russulales
- Family: Russulaceae
- Genus: Lactarius
- Species: L. chromospermus

Binomial name
- Lactarius chromospermus Pegler (1982)

Species of fungus

Lactarius chromospermus is a tropical African member of the large milk-cap genus Lactarius in the family Russulaceae, first described scientifically by David Pegler in 1982.

The species is unique both in the genus Lactarius and the family Russulaceae in having a chocolate brown spore print, which also gives the gills a brown colour and lets the fungus resemble species of the genus Agaricus. These distinct features might justify placing the species in its own section or subgenus within Lactarius.

Lactarius chromospermus is found in Miombo woodland, where it probably forms ectomycorrhiza with legumes of the genus Brachystegia. It seems to be a rare species; apart from the original collection made in Zambia, it has also been found in Burundi and Tanzania.

Lactarius chromospermus is not regarded as edible species: In Kirundi, it is known as isigazi, a collective name used for inedible mushrooms.

== See also ==
List of Lactarius species
