= Lactarius olympianus =

Scientific classification
- Kingdom: Fungi
- Division: Basidiomycota
- Class: Agaricomycetes
- Order: Russulales
- Family: Russulaceae
- Genus: Lactarius
- Species: L. olympianus

Binomial name
- Lactarius olympianus Hesler & A.H. Sm.

Species of fungus

Lactarius olympianus
- Mycological characteristics
- Gills on hymenium
- Cap is depressed
- Hymenium is adnate or subdecurrent
- Stipe is bare
- Spore print is cream
- Ecology is mycorrhizal
- Edibility is not recommended

Lactarius olympianus, commonly known as the olympic milk cap, is a species of mushroom in the family Russulaceae.

== Description ==
The cap of Lactarius olympianus is orange in color and about 5-10 centimeters in diameter. It is depressed, and frequently has concentric zones. The gills are yellowish or cream-colored, and sometimes stain brown. They are adnate to subdecurrent. The stipe is white in color and about 2-5 centimeters long and up to 2 centimeters wide. It bruises yellowish to brownish. The spore print is creamy. When cut, this mushroom produces milky white latex. This mushroom has an acrid taste.

== Habitat and ecology ==
Lactarius olympianus is mycorrhizal and can be found in the Western United States. It grows under fir and spruce at high elevations. In the Cascades, it is more often found with fir on the western side and with Engelmann spruce on the eastern side.
