= Necatorin =

Names
- IUPAC name 11-Hydroxychromeno[5,6-c]cinnolin-2-one
- Other names Necatorine

Identifiers
CAS Number	89915-35-5
3D model (JSmol)	Interactive image
ChemSpider	19985336
PubChem CID	135554414
UNII	PN6U3RP7RT
- InChI: InChI=1S/C15H8N2O3/c18-11-7-12-9(5-6-13(19)20-12)15-14(11)8-3-1-2-4-10(8)16-17-15/h1-7,18H Key: WNQBVKOXDIYRFH-UHFFFAOYSA-N
- SMILES: C1=CC=C2C(=C1)C3=C(C4=C(C=C3O)OC(=O)C=C4)N=N2

Properties
Chemical formula	C_{15}H_{8}N_{2}O_{3}
Molar mass	264.240 g·mol^{−1}
Melting point	220–225 °C (428–437 °F; 493–498 K)

Hazards
- Occupational safety and health (OHS/OSH)
Main hazards	Mutagenic
- Except where otherwise noted, data are given for materials in their standard state (at 25 °C [77 °F], 100 kPa). Infobox references

Necatorin is a highly mutagenic chemical compound with the molecular formula C_{15}H_{8}N_{2}O_{3}. It is found in some mushrooms including Lactarius turpis (ugly milk-cap; older: L. necator), from which it was first isolated and characterized. It tests positive in the Ames test, an assay for mutagenicity. Crude extracts of L. necator are also highly mutagenic in a bacterial test system, and this effect it attributed to necatorin.

Necatorin is present in L. necator at concentrations of 3 to 20 mg/kg, and blanching the mushroom can reduce it to about 25% of its original amount. In boiling water, the chemical compound is stable except under acidic conditions (pH = 5).
