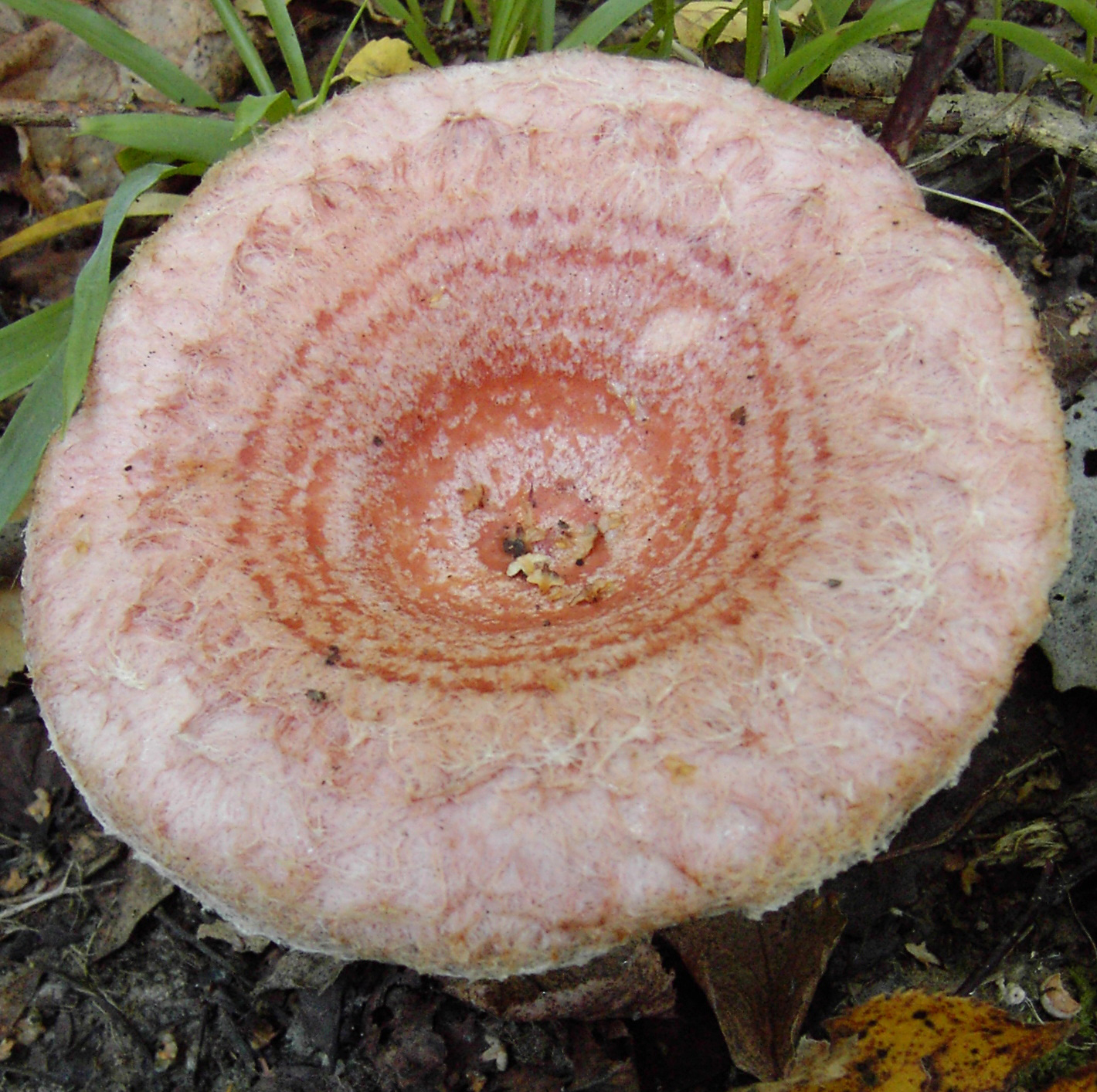
- Lactarius torminosus

Scientific classification
- Kingdom: Fungi
- Division: Basidiomycota
- Class: Agaricomycetes
- Order: Russulales
- Family: Russulaceae
- Genus: Lactarius; Pers. (1797)

Type species
- Lactarius torminosus (Schaeff.) Gray (1821)

Diversity
- c. 583 species

Synonyms
- Lactaria Pers. (1797); Agaricus sect. Lactifluus Pers. (1801); Agaricus subdiv. Galorrheus Fr. (1818); Lactariella J.Schröt. (1898); Lactariopsis Henn. (1901); Gloeocybe Earle (1909); Hypophyllum Earle (1909)

= Lactarius =

Genus of fungi

Lactarius is a genus of mushroom-producing, ectomycorrhizal fungi, containing several edible species. The species of the genus, commonly known as milk-caps, are characterized by the milky fluid ("latex") they exude when cut or damaged. Like the closely related genus Russula, their flesh has a distinctive brittle consistency. It is a large genus with over 500 known species, mainly distributed in the Northern hemisphere. Recently, the genus Lactifluus has been separated from Lactarius based on molecular phylogenetic evidence.

== Taxonomy ==
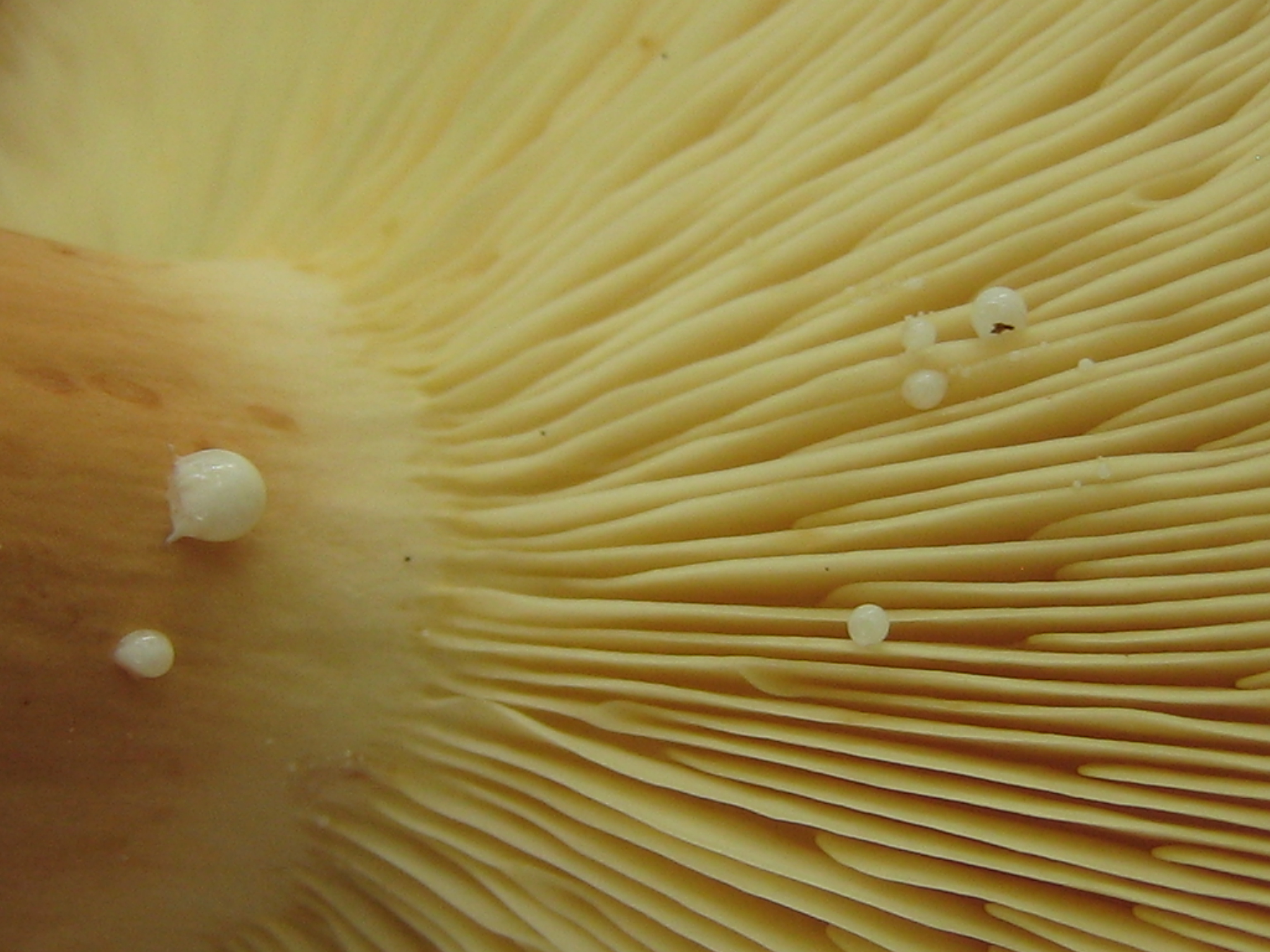
Small droplets of "latex" exuding from a damaged species of Lactarius.

The genus Lactarius was described by Christian Hendrik Persoon in 1797 with L. piperatus as the original type species. In 2011, L. torminosus was accepted as the new type of the genus after the splitting-off of Lactifluus as separate genus.

The name "Lactarius" is derived from the Latin lac, "milk".

=== Placement within Russulaceae ===
- - - Lactarius
    - Multifurca
  - Russula
- Lactifluus

Phylogenetic relationships of Lactarius, Lactifluus, Multifurca, and Russula according to Buyck et al. 2008.

Molecular phylogenetics uncovered that, while macromorphologically well-defined, milk-caps were in fact a paraphyletic genus; as a consequence, the genera Lactifluus was split from Lactarius, and the species L. furcatus was moved to the new genus Multifurca, together with some former Russula species. Multifurca also represents the likely sister group of Lactarius (see phylogeny, right). In the course of these taxonomical rearrangements, the name Lactarius was conserved for the genus with the new type species Lactarius torminosus; this way, the name Lactarius could be retained for the bigger genus with many well-known temperate species, while the name Lactifluus has to be applied only to a smaller number of species, containing mainly tropical, but also some temperate milk-caps such as Lactifluus volemus and Lf. vellereus.

=== Relationships within Lactarius ===
Phylogenetic analyses have also revealed that Lactarius, in the strict sense, contains some species with closed (angiocarpous) fruitbodies, e.g. L. angiocarpus described from Zambia. The angiocarpous genera Arcangeliella and Zelleromyces are phylogenetically part of Lactarius.

Systematics within the genus Lactarius is a subject of ongoing research. Three subgenera are currently accepted and supported by molecular phylogenetics:

- Piperites: Northern temperate region, three species in tropical Africa.
- Russularia: Northern temperate region and tropical Asia.
- Plinthogalus: Northern temperate region, tropical Africa, and tropical Asia.

Some additional species, all tropical, do not seem to fall into these subgenera and occupy more basal positions within Lactarius. This includes for example L. chromospermus from tropical Africa with an odd brown spore color.

Currently, over 600 species of the genus Lactarius are recognised, while the angiocarpous genera Arcangeliella and Zelleromyces have not yet been synonymized with Lactarius. It is estimated that a significant number of Lactarius species remain to be described.

=== Selected species ===
- Lactarius deliciosus - saffron milk-cap or red pine mushroom
- Lactarius deterrimus - false saffron milk-cap
- Lactarius indigo - indigo milk-cap
- Lactarius quietus - oak milk-cap
- Lactarius torminosus - woolly milk-cap
- Lactarius turpis - ugly milk-cap
- Lactarius trivialis - dark purple or creamy brown cap

== Description ==
=== Macromorphology ===
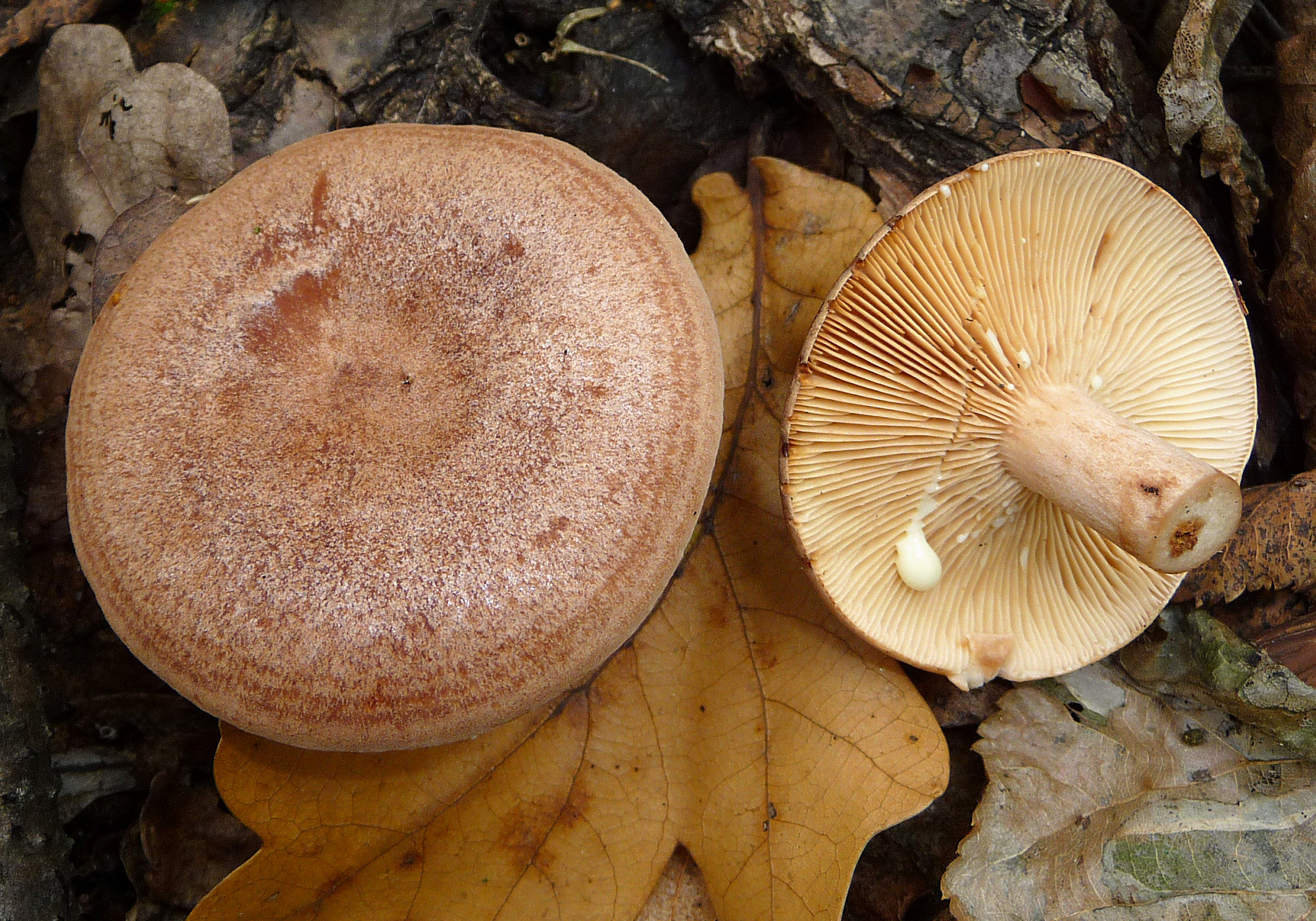
Lactarius quietus exuding cream-colored latex from gills upon cut.

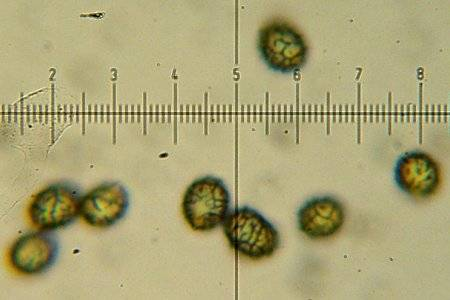
Spores of Lactarius alnicola showing a reticulate (net-like) ornament with an amyloid stain reaction.

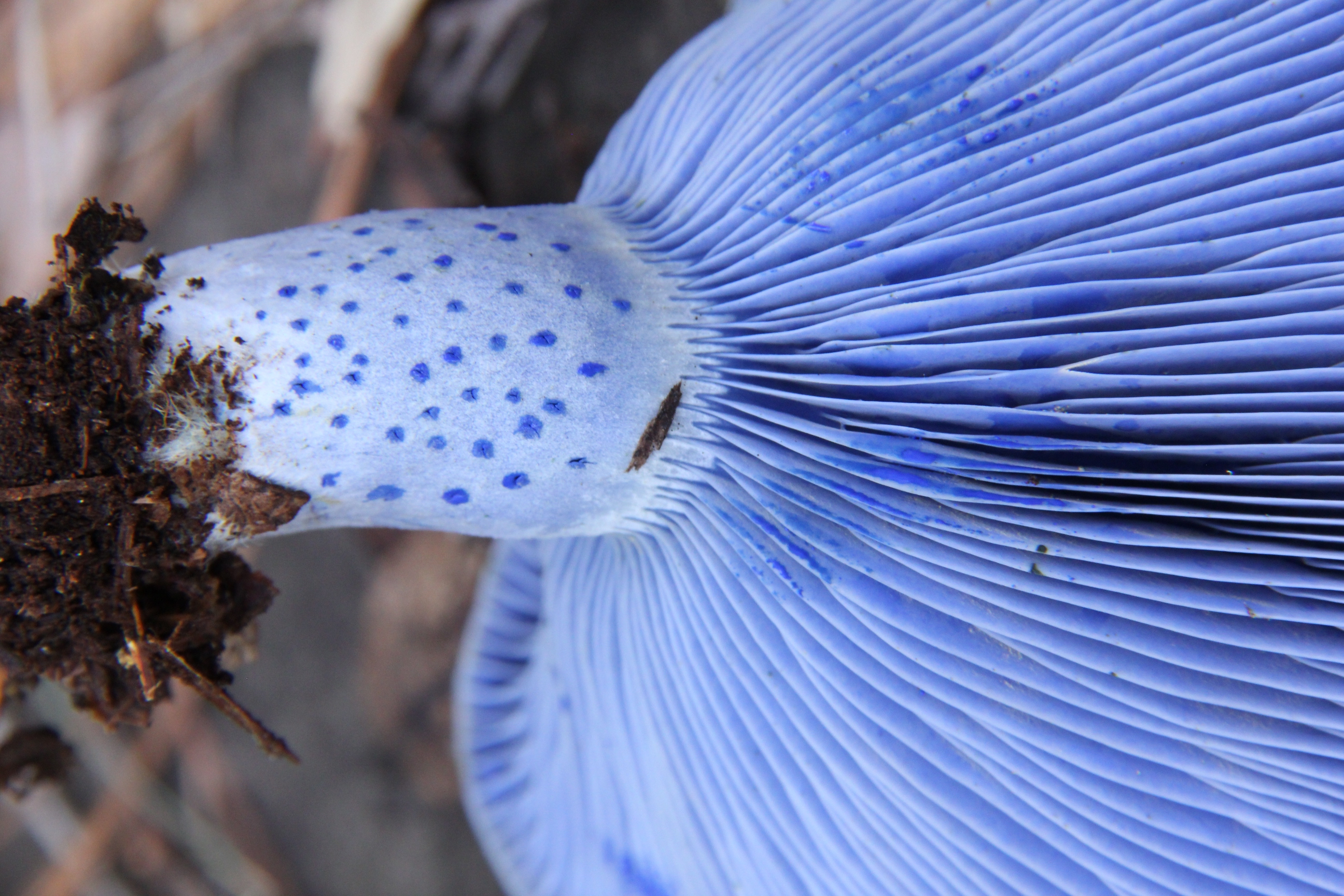
Lactarius indigo is one of the most strikingly colored Lactarius.

The eponymous "milk" and the brittle consistency of the flesh are the most prominent field characters of milk-cap fruitbodies. The milk or latex emerging from bruised flesh is often white or cream, but more vividly coloured in some species; it can change upon exposition or remain unchanged. Fruitbodies are small to very large, gilled, rather fleshy, without veil, often depressed or even funnel-shaped with decurrent gills. Cap surface can be glabrous, velvety or pilose, dry, sticky or viscose and is often zonate. Several species have pits (scrobicules) on the cap or pileus surface. Dull colors prevail, but some more colorful species exist, e.g. the blue Lactarius indigo or the orange species of section Deliciosi. Spore print color is white to ocher or, in some cases, pinkish. Some species have angiocarpous, i.e., closed fruitbodies.

=== Micromorphology ===
Microscopically, Lactarius species have elliptical, rarely globoid spores with amyloid ornamentation in the form of more or less prominent warts or spines, connected by ridges, like other members of the family Russulaceae. The trama (flesh) contains spherical cells that cause the brittle structure. Unlike Russula, Lactarius also have lactiferous, i.e. latex-carrying hyphae in their trama.

=== Species identification ===
Distinguishing Lactarius from Lactifluus based on morphology alone is difficult; there are no synapomorphic characters known so far that define both genera unequivocally but tendencies exist: zonate and viscose to glutinose caps are only found in Lactarius, as well as closed (angiocarpous) and sequestrate fruitbodies. All known annulate and pleurotoid (i.e., laterally stiped) milk-caps, on the contrary, belong to Lactifluus.

Characters important for identification of milk-caps (Lactarius and Lactifluus) are: initial colour of the latex and color change, texture of cap surface, taste (mild, peppery, or bitter) of latex and flesh, odor, and microscopical features of the spores and the cap cuticle (pileipellis). The habitat and especially the type of host tree can also be critical. While there are some easily recognizable species, other species can be quite hard to determine without microscopical examination.

== Distribution and habitat ==
Lactarius is one of the most prominent genera of mushroom-forming fungi in the Northern hemisphere. It also occurs natively in Northern Africa, tropical Africa, tropical Asia, Central America, and Australia. Its possible native distribution in South America and different parts of Australasia is unclear, as many species in those regions, poorly known, might in fact belong to Lactifluus, which has a more tropical distribution than Lactarius. Several species have also been introduced with their host trees outside their native range, e.g. in South America, Southern Africa, Australia, and New Zealand.

== Ecology ==
Lactarius belongs to a lineage of ectomycorrhiza obligate symbionts. As such, they are dependent on the occurrence of possible host plants. Confirmed habitats apart from temperate forests include arctic tundra and boreal forest, mediterranean maquis, tropical African shrubland, tropical Asian rainforest, mesoamerican tropical oak forests, and Australian Eucalyptus forests.

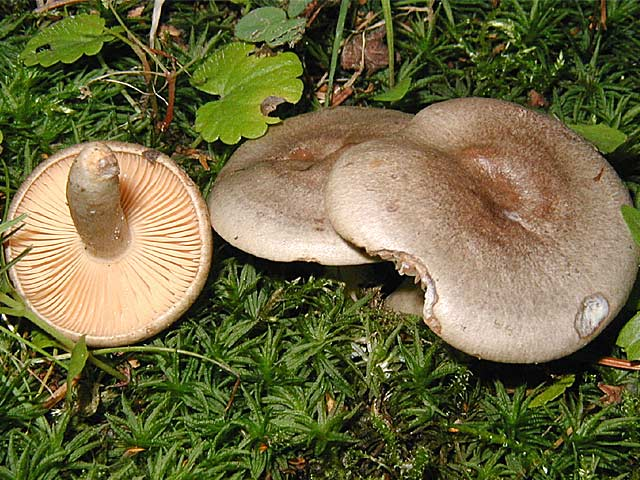
Lactarius pyrogalus mainly associates with common hazel.

While most species display a preference towards either broadleaf or coniferous hosts, some are more strictly associated with certain genera or species of plant hosts. A well-studied example is that of alders, which have several specialized Lactarius symbionts (e.g. L. alpinus, L. brunneohepaticus, L. lilacinus), some of which even evolved specificity to one of the Alnus subgenera. Other examples of specialized associations of Lactarius are with Cistus shrubs (L. cistophilus and L. tesquorum), beech (e.g. L. blennius), birches (e.g. L. pubescens), hazel (e.g. L. pyrogalus), oak (e.g. L. quietus), pines (e.g. L. deliciosus), or fir (e.g. L. deterrimus). For most tropical species, host plant range is poorly known, but species in tropical Africa seem to be rather generalist.

Lactarius species are considered late-stage colonizers, that means, they are generally not present in early-colonizing vegetation, but establish in later phases of succession. However, species symbiotic with early colonizing trees, such as L. pubescens with birch, will rather occur in early stages. Several species have preferences regarding soil pH and humidity, which will determine the habitats in which they occur.

Fungi of this genus have been recorded as a main food of the pleasing fungus beetle Tritoma angulata.

== Edibility ==
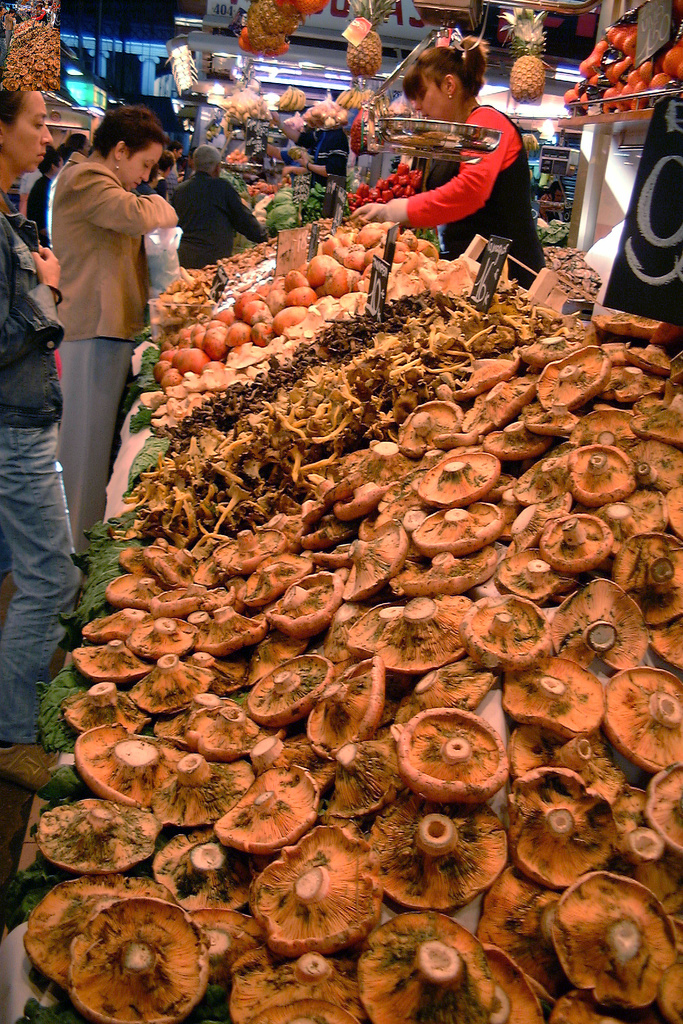
Lactarius deliciosus for sale on a market in Barcelona, Spain

Several Lactarius species are edible. L. deliciosus notably ranks among the most highly valued mushrooms in the Northern hemisphere, while opinions vary on the taste of other species, such as L. indigo or L. deterrimus. Several species are reported to be regularly collected for food in Russia, Tanzania and Hunan, China. Some Lactarius are considered toxic, for example L. turpis, which contains the mutagenic compound necatorin, or L. helvus. There are, however, no deadly poisonous mushrooms in the genus. Bitter or peppery species, for example L. torminosus, are generally not considered edible, at least raw, but are nevertheless consumed in some regions, e.g. in Finland. Some small, fragrant species, such as the "candy caps", are sometimes used as flavoring.

L. deliciosus is one of the few ectomycorrhizal mushrooms that has been successfully cultivated.

== Chemistry ==
Different bioactive compounds have been isolated from Lactarius species, such as sesquiterpenoids, aromatic volatiles, and mutagenic substances. Pigments have been isolated from colored Lactarius species, such as L. deliciosus or L. indigo.

== Pharmacology ==
An extract of Lactarius badiosanguineus exhibits inhibitory activity on thrombin.

== See also ==
- List of Lactifluus species
