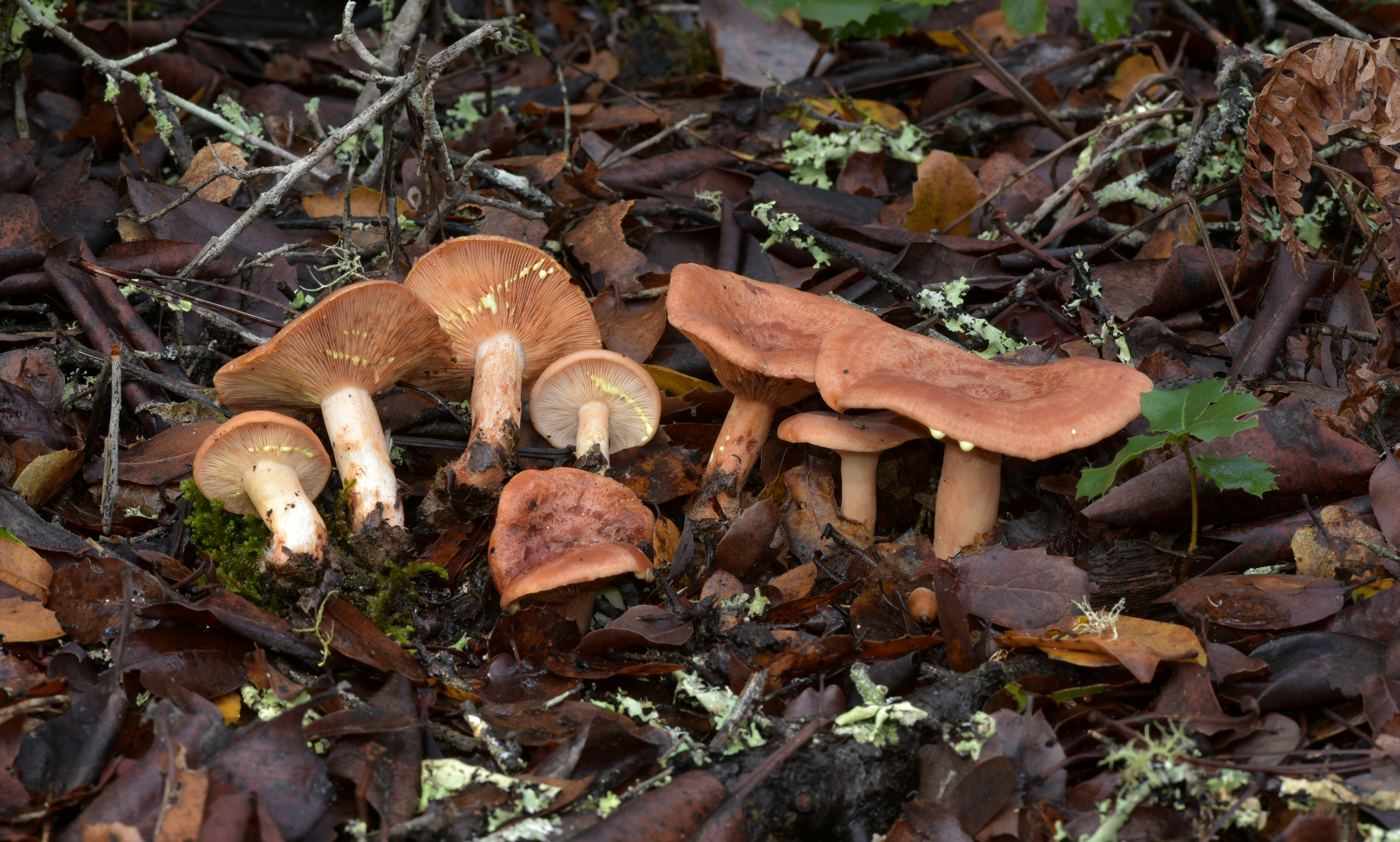

Scientific classification
- Kingdom: Fungi
- Division: Basidiomycota
- Class: Agaricomycetes
- Order: Russulales
- Family: Russulaceae
- Genus: Lactarius
- Species: L. xanthogalactus

Binomial name
- Lactarius xanthogalactus Peck (1907)

= Lactarius xanthogalactus =

Species of fungus

Lactarius xanthogalactus
- Mycological characteristics
- Gills on hymenium
- Cap is depressed
- Hymenium is decurrent
- Stipe is bare
- Spore print is white to yellow
- Ecology is mycorrhizal
- Edibility is poisonous

Lactarius xanthogalactus, commonly known as the yellow-staining milkcap is a species of fungus in the family Russulaceae. Several other Lactarius species that bear resemblance to L. xanthogalactus, but most can be distinguished by differences in staining reactions, macroscopic characteristics, or habitat.

The species is found on the west coast of the United States and grows in the ground under trees.

It is poisonous.

== Taxonomy and classification ==
The species was first described by American mycologist Charles Horton Peck in 1907.

The specific epithet xanthogalactus is derived from the Greek words meaning "yellow" and "milk".

== Description ==
The species produces mushrooms with pinkish-cinnamon caps measuring 3–11 cm (1 1/4–4 1/4 in) wide held by pinkish-white stems 2–6 cm (3/4–2 1/4 in) long and 0.7–2 cm (1/4–3/4 in) wide. When it is cut or injured, the mushroom oozes a white latex that rapidly turns bright sulfur-yellow. The spores are pale yellow, elliptical and bumpy. The spore print is pale yellow. The mushroom has an unpleasant taste.

=== Similar species ===
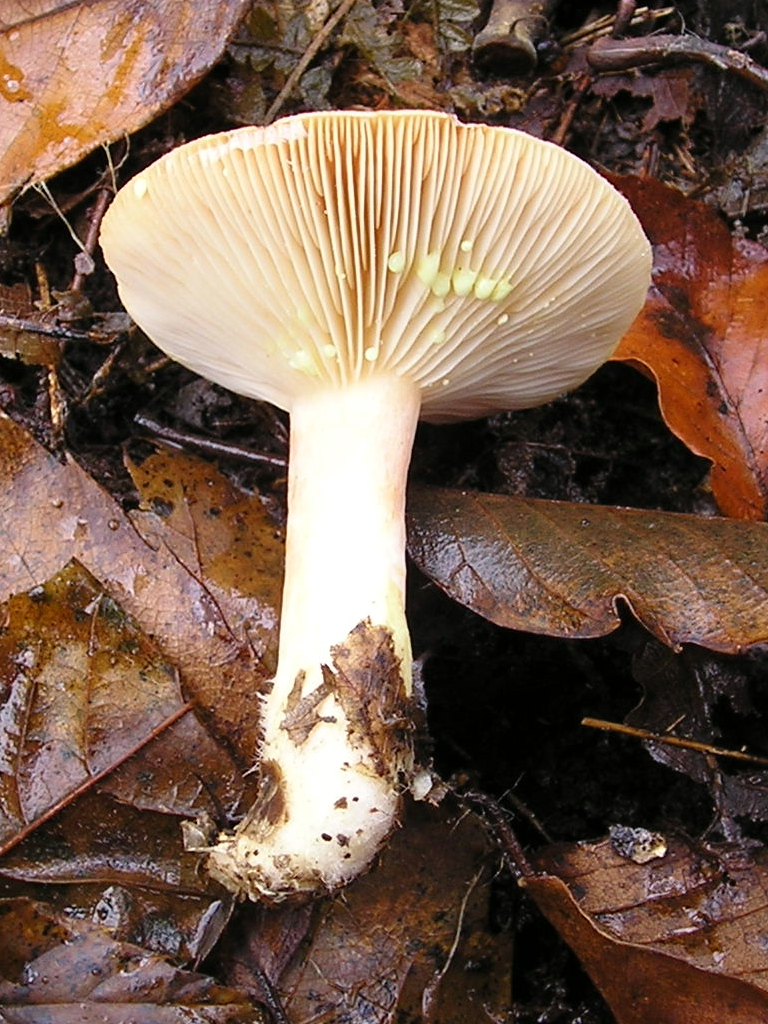
L. chrysorrheus also produces yellow latex.

Lactarius vinaceorufescens has nearly identical microscopic features to L. xanthogalactus, but macroscopically it has reddish-vinaceous stains that develop on the cap, gills, and stem. Another lookalike is L. colorascens, but it may be distinguished from L. xanthogalactus by several features: a smaller fruit body; a whitish cap that becomes brownish-red with age and does not spot vinaceous or brown; bitter to faintly acrid latex; and slightly smaller spores. L. chrysorrheus is also similar, but it has a whitish to pale yellowish-cinnamon cap with slightly darker spots and grows under hardwoods (especially oak) on well-drained, often sandy soil, and its gills do not discolor or spot vinaceous or brown.

Other superficially similar species include L. rubrilacteus, L. rufus, L. subviscidus, L. fragilis and L. rufulus, but none of these species have the yellow staining reaction characteristic of L. xanthogalactus. It could also be mistaken with L. rubidus, which is redder and sweet smelling, and L. substriatus, which has a red-orange cap and white latex that yellows.

== Habitat and distribution ==
The fruit bodies grow scattered or in groups on the ground under conifers and hardwoods between November and February in Oregon and California.

== See also ==
- List of Lactarius species
