= Bleeding milkcap =

The term bleeding milkcap is used to describe at least two mushrooms of the genus Lactarius:

- Lactarius rubrilacteus
- Lactarius sanguifluus
