= Sotolon =

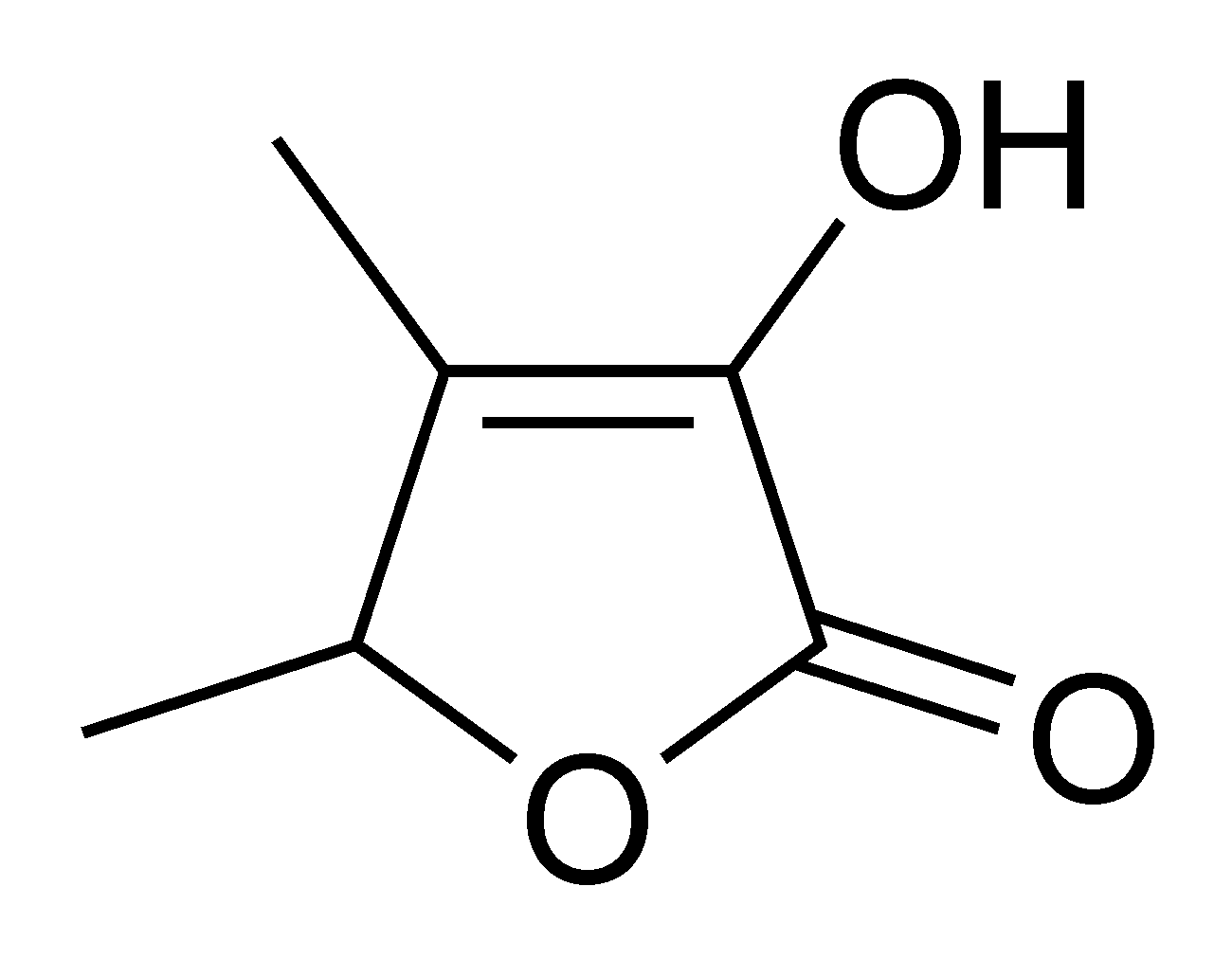

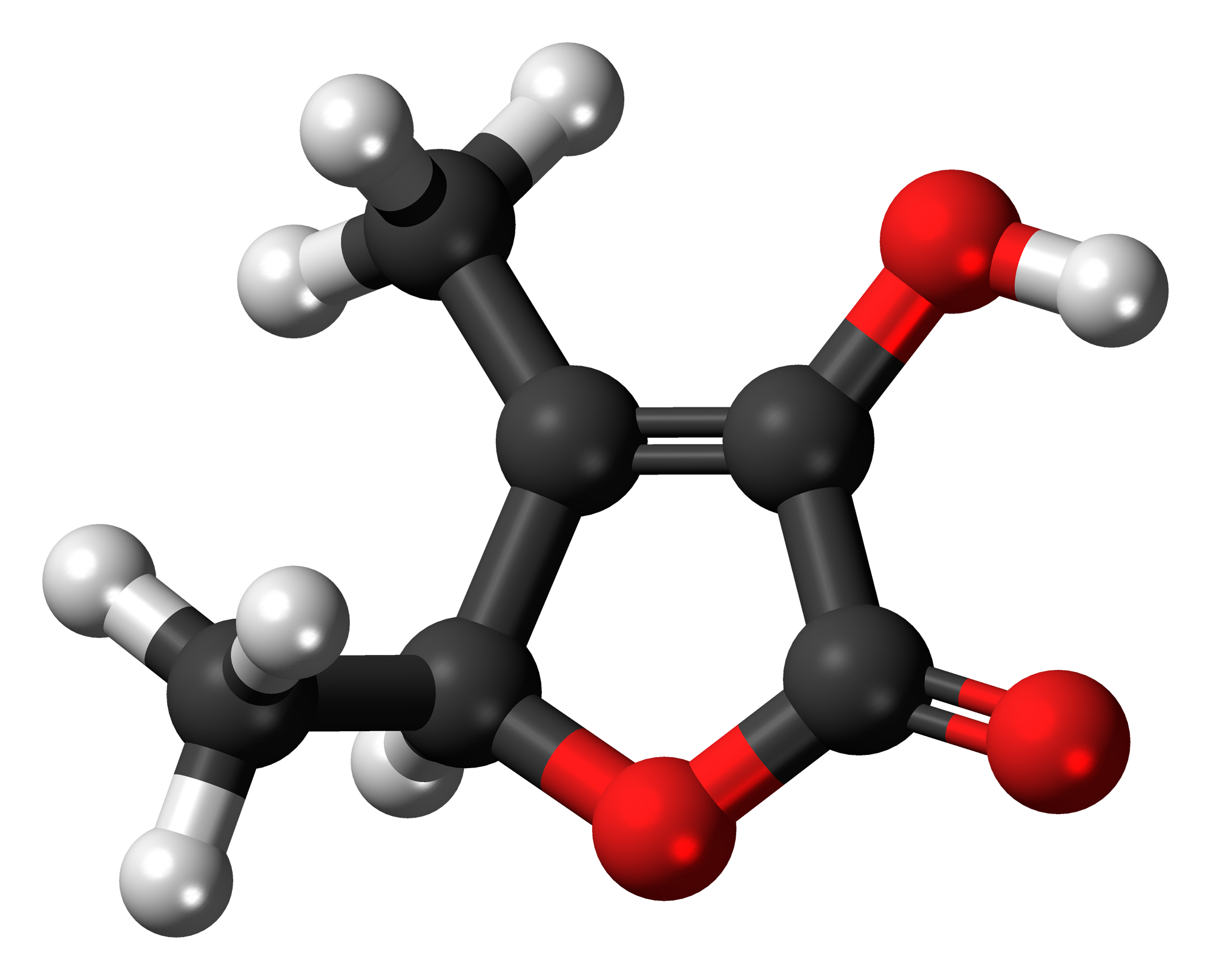

Names
- Preferred IUPAC name 3-Hydroxy-4,5-dimethylfuran-2(5H)-one
- Other names Sotolone; Caramel furanone Sugar lactone Fenugreek lactone

Identifiers
CAS Number	28664-35-9
3D model (JSmol)	Interactive image
ChemSpider	56569
ECHA InfoCard	100.044.655
PubChem CID	62835
UNII	T62RL2NEGW
CompTox Dashboard (EPA)	DTXSID4047674
- InChI: InChI=1S/C6H8O3/c1-3-4(2)9-6(8)5(3)7/h4,7H,1-2H3 Key: UNYNVICDCJHOPO-UHFFFAOYSA-N
- SMILES: O=C1OC(C)C(C)=C1O

Properties
Chemical formula	C_{6}H_{8}O_{3}
Molar mass	128.127 g·mol^{−1}
Density	1.049 g/cm^{3}
Melting point	26 to 29 °C (79 to 84 °F; 299 to 302 K)
Boiling point	184 °C (363 °F; 457 K)
- Except where otherwise noted, data are given for materials in their standard state (at 25 °C [77 °F], 100 kPa). verify (what is ?) Infobox references

Sotolon (also known as sotolone) is a butenolide lactone and an extremely potent aroma compound, with the typical smell of fenugreek or curry at high concentrations and maple syrup, caramel, or burnt sugar at lower concentrations. Sotolon is the major aroma and flavor component of fenugreek seed and lovage, and is one of several aromatic and flavor components of artificial maple syrup. It is also present in molasses, aged rum, aged sake and white wine, flor sherry, roast tobacco, and dried fruiting bodies of the mushroom Lactarius helvus. Sotolon can pass through the body relatively unchanged, and consumption of foods high in sotolon, such as fenugreek, can impart a maple syrup aroma to one's sweat and urine. In some individuals with the genetic disorder maple syrup urine disease, sotolon is spontaneously produced in their bodies and excreted in their urine, leading to the disease's characteristic smell.

This molecule is thought to be responsible for the mysterious maple syrup smell that has occasionally wafted over Manhattan since 2005, with the source of the sotolon being a factory in New Jersey that processes the herb fenugreek.

Sotolon was first isolated in 1975 from fenugreek. The compound was named in 1980 when it was found to be responsible for the flavor of raw cane sugar: soto (粗糖, sotō) means "raw sugar" in Japanese and the suffix -olon signifies that the molecule is an enol lactone.

Several aging-derived compounds have been pointed out as playing an important role on the aroma of fortified wines; however, sotolon (3-hydroxy-4,5-dimethyl-2(5H)-furanone) is recognized as being the key odorant and has also been classified as a potential aging marker of these types of wines. This chiral lactone is a powerful odorant, which can impart a nutty, caramel, curry, or rancid odor, depending on its concentration and enantiomeric distribution. Despite being pointed out as a key odorant of other fortified wines, the researchers' attention has also been directed to its off-flavor character, associated to the premature oxidative aging of young dry white wines, overlapping the expected fruity, flowery, and fresh character. This compound can be detected by miniaturized emulsification extraction followed by GC–MS/SIM and single-step miniaturized liquid-liquid extraction followed by LC-MS/MS analysis

== French vin jaune ==
Vin jaune is marked by the formation of sotolon from α-ketobutyric acid.

== See also ==
- Candy cap (Lactarius mushroom species whose maple syrup aroma derives from quabalactone III, which hydrolyzes into sotolon).
