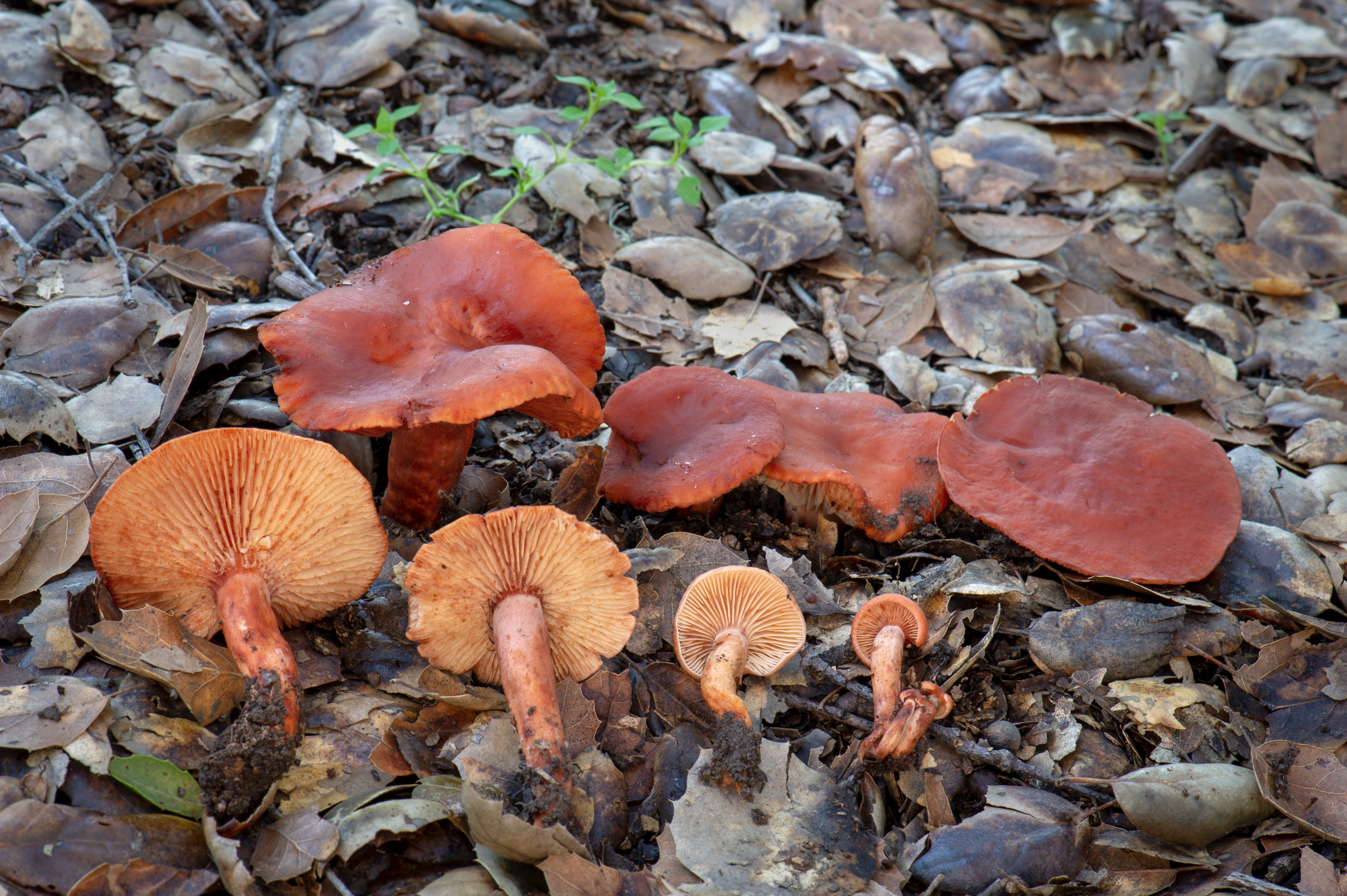

Scientific classification
- Kingdom: Fungi
- Division: Basidiomycota
- Class: Agaricomycetes
- Order: Russulales
- Family: Russulaceae
- Genus: Lactarius
- Species: L. rufulus

Binomial name
- Lactarius rufulus Peck (1907)

= Lactarius rufulus =

Species of fungus

Lactarius rufulus
- Mycological characteristics
- Gills on hymenium
- Cap is depressed
- Hymenium is decurrent
- Stipe is bare
- Spore print is cream to yellow
- Ecology is mycorrhizal
- Edibility is edible

Lactarius rufulus, also known as the rufous candy cap or the southern candy cap, is a species of fungus in the family Russulaceae. The fruit bodies have fleshy brownish-red caps up to 10 cm (3.9 in) wide, and closely spaced pinkish-yellow gills. The stem is up to 12 cm (4.7 in) long and 3 cm (1.2 in) thick and colored similarly to the cap. The fruit bodies resembles those of L. rufus, but L. rufulus tends to grow in clusters at a common base, rather than solitarily or in groups. A distinguishing microscopic characteristic is the near absence of large, spherical cells called sphaerocysts that are otherwise common in Lactarius species.

The species, known only from California, Arizona, and Mexico, grows on the ground in leaf litter near oak trees. Lactarius rufulus mushrooms are edible, and have an odor resembling maple syrup. They have been used to flavor confections and desserts.

== Taxonomy ==
The species was first described by American mycologist Charles Horton Peck in 1907, based on specimens collected at Stanford University in California. The type collections were made by A.M. Patterson and S. Nohara, botany students at Stanford University who made a number of collections during the winter of 1906–07.

Lactarius rufulus is classified in the section Thejogali of the subgenus Russularia of the genus Lactarius. The surface characteristics of many species in section Thejogali (as defined by Hesler and Smith in 1979) are called rimulose-areolate (irregularly cracked, with the cracks crossing one another) based on a surface with "numerous mounds of inflated cells" paired together with crevices.

The mushroom is commonly known as the "rufous candy cap".

== Description ==
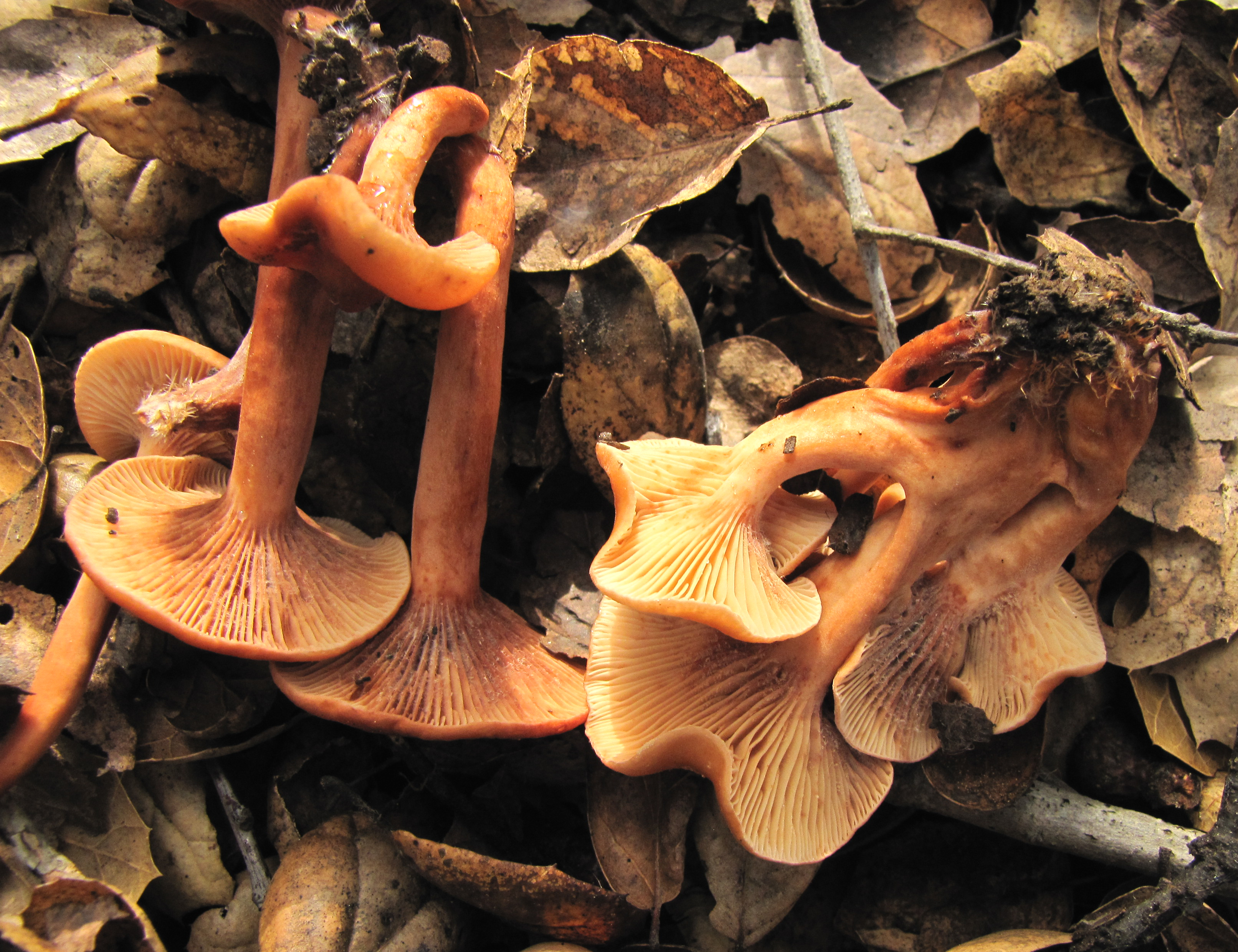
The gills are subdecurrent, running slightly down the length of the stem.

The cap of L. rufulus is 3–10 cm (1.2–3.9 in) wide, broadly convex, becoming flattened and eventually shallowly funnel-shaped, sometimes with a slight umbo. The cap margin (edge) is initially curved inwards but becomes curved upward in maturity. The surface is usually uneven or wrinkled. It is brownish red at first, but fades to orange-brown with age. The attachment of the gills to the stem is adnate (squarely attached) to subdecurrent (running slightly down the length of the stem). They are packed close together, at first pinkish-yellow, but with age become a darker red or reddish brown. The gills are not forked, nor do they stain a different color when bruised. The stem is 4–8 cm (1.6–3.1 in) long, about 0.5–1.5 cm (0.2–0.6 in) thick, nearly equal or slightly enlarged downward, dry, smooth, and reddish brown. (Note: Arora gives a larger maximum range for both the stem length and width—12 cm (4.7 in) and 3 cm (1.2 in), respectively.) It may be solid or stuffed (filled with cotton-like mycelia), but may become partially hollow with age. The flesh is firm, white to pinkish-orange, and does not stain when cut. The latex is scant, white, unchanging, and does not stain tissues. Its taste is mild. The spore print is white to creamy yellow.

=== Microscopic characteristics ===
The spores are 7–9 by 7–9 μm, spherical or nearly so, ornamented with a partial to complete reticulum (a system of raised, net-like ridges), with prominences up to 0.5 μm high. The basidia (spore-bearing cells) are both two- and four-spored, and measure 45–52 by 9–11 μm. The cap cuticle is a poorly formed layer of inflated cells with scattered filamentous pileocystidia (cystidia on the cap). Somewhat unusual for a Lactarius, L. rufulus lacks or has few swollen cells (sphaerocysts) in the cap and stem.

=== Similar species ===
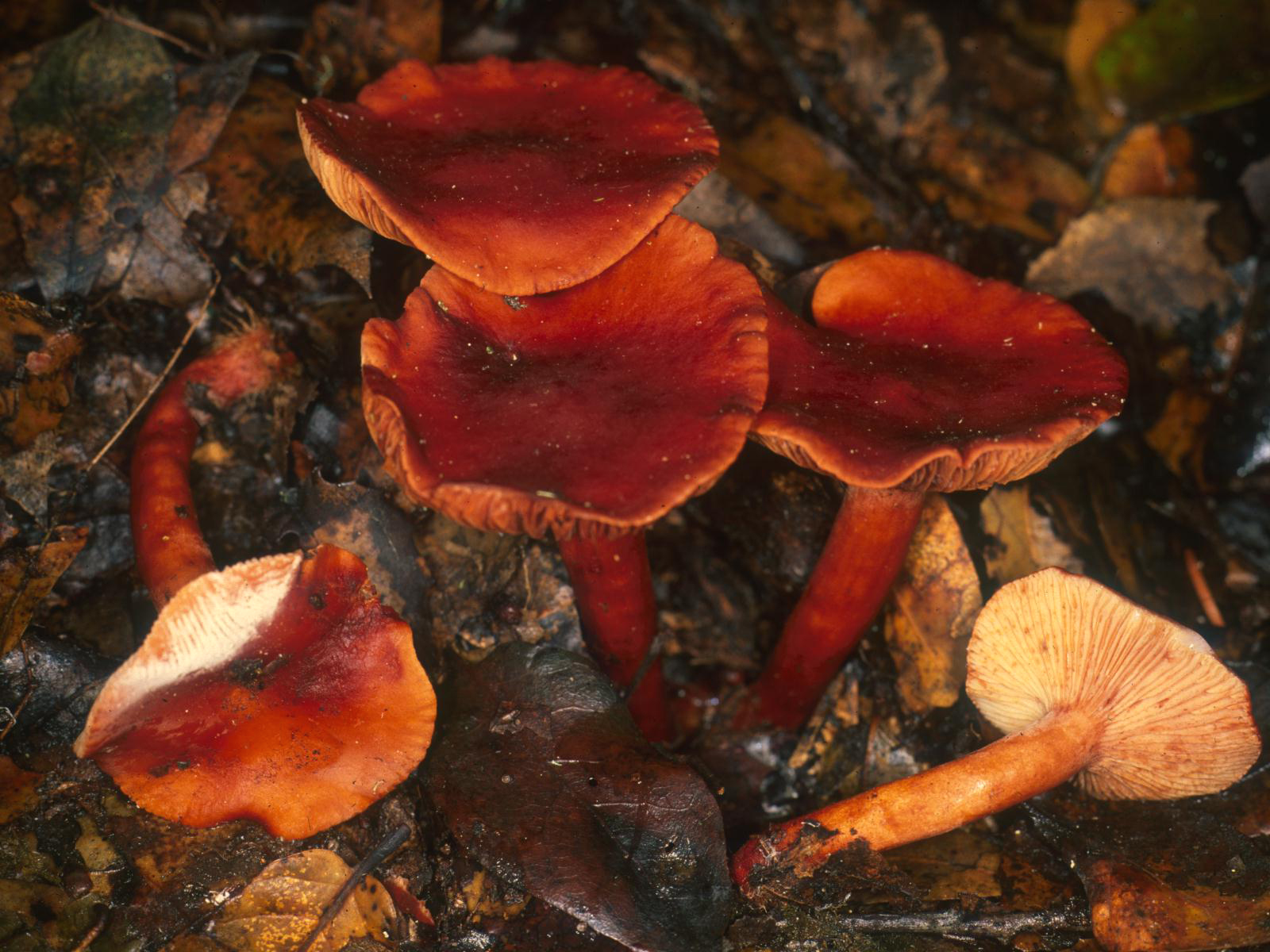
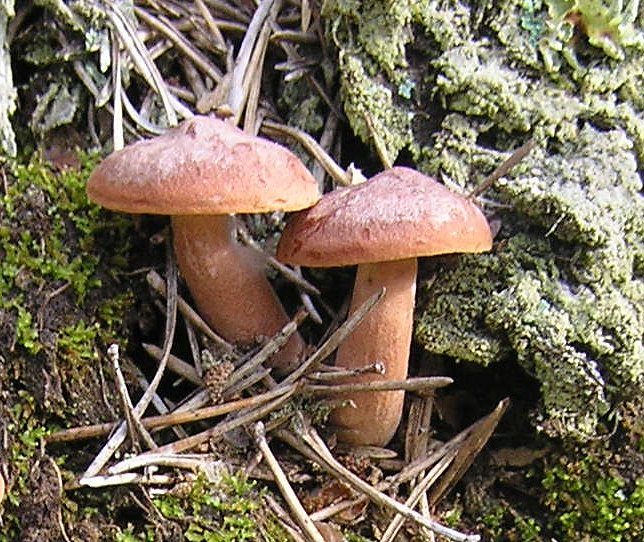
Lookalikes include L. rubidus (left) and L. rufus (right)

Lactarius rubidus is similar in appearance to L. rufulus, but it has watery to whey-like latex and develops a strong odor of maple syrup or butterscotch when dried. Another lookalike is Lactarius thiersii, but it has a smaller cap and stem and has mild-tasting flesh and latex. The flesh and latex of Lactarius rufus have a strongly acrid taste, and its fruit bodies are stouter and lack an umbo. Additionally, L. rufus typically grows in a caespitose manner—with the fruit bodies clustered at a common base, and has more pallid colors and a more intense odor than L. rufulus. L. vinaceorufescens has a yellowing latex.

== Ecology, habitat, and distribution ==
Lactarius rufulus is a mycorrhizal species, and lives in a mutualistic association with oak species. The fungus forms an ectomycorrhizae—characterized by an external sheath that surround the rootlets of the oak. The fungus receives soluble carbohydrates that are byproducts of the plant's photosynthesis, while affording the plant greater access to soil nutrients needed for growth. The fruit bodies of L. rufulus grow scattered or in groups on the ground under oak, usually from January to March; their appearance is uncommon. Once thought to be only in California (where they are most prevalent in the southern part of the state), they were reported from Mexico in 1998, and from Arizona in 2006.

== Uses ==
The mushroom is edible, with a mild taste and a slight odor of maple syrup. (Note: For reasons unexplained, several authors, including Peck, and Hesler and Smith, have omitted mentioning the odor of the fruit bodies.) American author David Arora suggests that the fruit bodies may be used in a manner similar to the candy cap mushrooms, despite being not as fragrant. Chefs in the San Francisco Bay Area have been known to use it for desserts such as ice creams, cakes and caramels.

== See also ==
- List of Lactarius species
