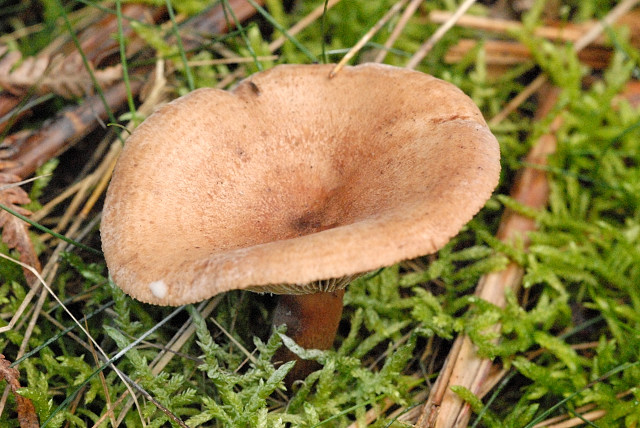

Scientific classification
- Kingdom: Fungi
- Division: Basidiomycota
- Class: Agaricomycetes
- Order: Russulales
- Family: Russulaceae
- Genus: Lactarius
- Species: L. helvus

Binomial name
- Lactarius helvus (Fr.) Fr. (1838)

Synonyms
- Agaricus helvus Fr. (1821); Galorrheus helvus (Fr.) P.Kumm. (1871); Lactifluus helvus (Fr.) Kuntze (1891)

= Lactarius helvus =

Species of fungus

Lactarius helvus
- Mycological characteristics
- Gills on hymenium
- Cap is depressed
- Hymenium is decurrent
- Stipe is bare
- Spore print is tan
- Ecology is mycorrhizal
- Edibility is poisonous

Lactarius helvus, commonly known in English as fenugreek milkcap, is a member of the large milkcap genus Lactarius in the order Russulales. Fruiting bodies can be found in Sphagnum moss in coniferous and deciduous woodland in Europe, and possibly North America, although considerable debate continues about the North American variety, formerly referred to as Lactarius aquifluus. Mushrooms are pale brown-grey or beige in colour and funnel-shaped, with colourless, watery milk. Its distinctive smell has been likened to fenugreek, celery, liquorice, or Maggi instant soup. Mildly toxic when raw, it has been implicated in the poisoning of 418 people near Leipzig in October 1949. However, it is used in small quantities as a spice when dried. Sotolon, the agent that gives the fungus its odour, also occurs in fenugreek, maple syrup and lovage.

The possible North American variety has a more salmon to pink color with scant watery milk and a strong smell of maple syrup or caramel. In Quebec it is known as the maple milky cap (Lactaire à odeur d'érable), and is fairly commonly eaten cooked and also sold as a dried powder and used as a spice, much in the same way that the candy cap mushroom is used on the west coast. Thus far, there have been no reported cases of illness from this variety in North America. Some confusion with the species Lactarius quietus var incanus is possible due to the similar smell. Lactarius quietus var incus, however, has a darker and more red appearance and when young, its milk is opaque and white, as opposed to the clear milk in Lactarius helvus. Furthermore, the possible North American variety of Lactarius helvus is restricted in distribution to the great lakes and north east, while lactarius quietus var incanus is commonly found much further south.

== Taxonomy ==
It was initially described by Elias Magnus Fries in 1821 as Agaricus helvus, before he placed it in the genus Lactarius in 1838. Peck's Lactarius aquifluus has been deemed a synonym. The specific epithet helvus is derived from the Latin for 'honey-yellow'. Its name in German is Maggipilz. S

== Description ==
The velvety cap is initially slightly convex (planoconvex), becoming funnel-shaped (infundibuliform) as it matures; it is 4–15 cm (1½–4 in) in diameter and has a faint zonate (bull's-eye) pattern, beige or light grey at the margins and darkening toward the centre. The decurrent gills are cream when young, and darkening to ochre-yellow with age. The flesh is white or beige, often pink-tinged. The latex, or milk, is watery and colourless. The hollow cylindrical stalk is 3–9 cm (1–3½ in) high by 1–2 cm (½ in) wide. It may be whitish when young, ochre or pink-tinged, and sometimes spotted orange-brown. The highly distinctive smell has been described as reminiscent of fenugreek, with a mild taste. To others, the smell has been likened to lovage or celery, or liquorice or a packet of Maggi instant soup.

== Distribution and habitat ==
Fruiting bodies are found in groups in woodlands near conifers such as Picea and Pinus, as well as the deciduous birch (Betula) and rarely beech (Fagus). More specifically, they occur in wet places, often growing in Sphagnum, in late summer and autumn. The species is found across Europe and Asia.

== Toxicity ==
Sotolon

Symptoms of poisoning are reported to occur within thirty minutes of consumption, with nausea and vomiting accompanied by vertigo and chills. The toxic agents are thought to be sesquiterpenes. In October 1949, 418 people were poisoned near Leipzig in eastern Germany. The toxins are destroyed by thorough boiling, and the species is used in small quantities as a spice after drying.

The agent which gives the fungus its distinctive odour is sotolon, which also gives fenugreek seed and lovage their characteristic smells. It is present as well in molasses, aged sake and white wine, flor sherry, and roasted tobacco, as well as in maple syrup.

== See also ==
- List of Lactarius species
