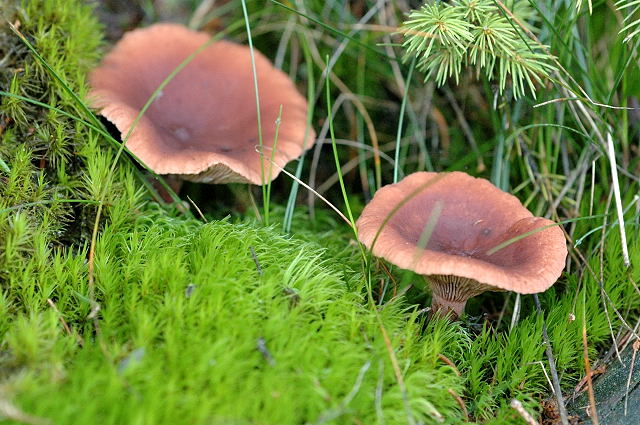
- Lactarius camphoratus

Scientific classification
- Kingdom: Fungi
- Division: Basidiomycota
- Class: Agaricomycetes
- Order: Russulales
- Family: Russulaceae
- Genus: Lactarius

Species
- L. camphoratus L. rubidus

= Candy cap =

Candy caps

Species of fungus

Candy cap
- Mycological characteristics
- Gills on hymenium
- Cap is convex or flat
- Hymenium is decurrent
- Stipe is bare
- Spore print is white to yellow
- Ecology is mycorrhizal
- Edibility is choice

Candy cap and curry milkcap are common names for two closely related species of Lactarius: L. camphoratus and L. rubidus. Additionally, L. rufulus is termed the southern candy cap. Many similar species are known.

Candy caps are valued for their highly aromatic qualities and are used as a flavoring.

== Taxonomy ==
The candy caps have been placed in various infrageneric groups of Lactarius depending on the author. Bon defined the candy caps and allies as making up the subsection Camphoratini of the section Olentes. Subsection Camphoratini is defined by their similarity in color, odor (with the exception of L. rostratus), and by the presence of macrocystidia on their hymenium. (The other subsection of Olentes, Serifluini, is also aromatic, but have very different aromas from the Camphoratini and are entirely lacking in cystidia.)

Bon and later European authors treated all species that were aromatic and had at least a partially epithelial pileipellis as section Olentes, whereas Hesler and Smith and later North American authors treat all species with such a pileipellis (both aromatic and non-aromatic) as the section Thojogali. However, a thorough molecular phylogenetic investigation of Lactarius has yet to be published, and older classification systems of Lactarius are generally not regarded as natural.

== Description ==
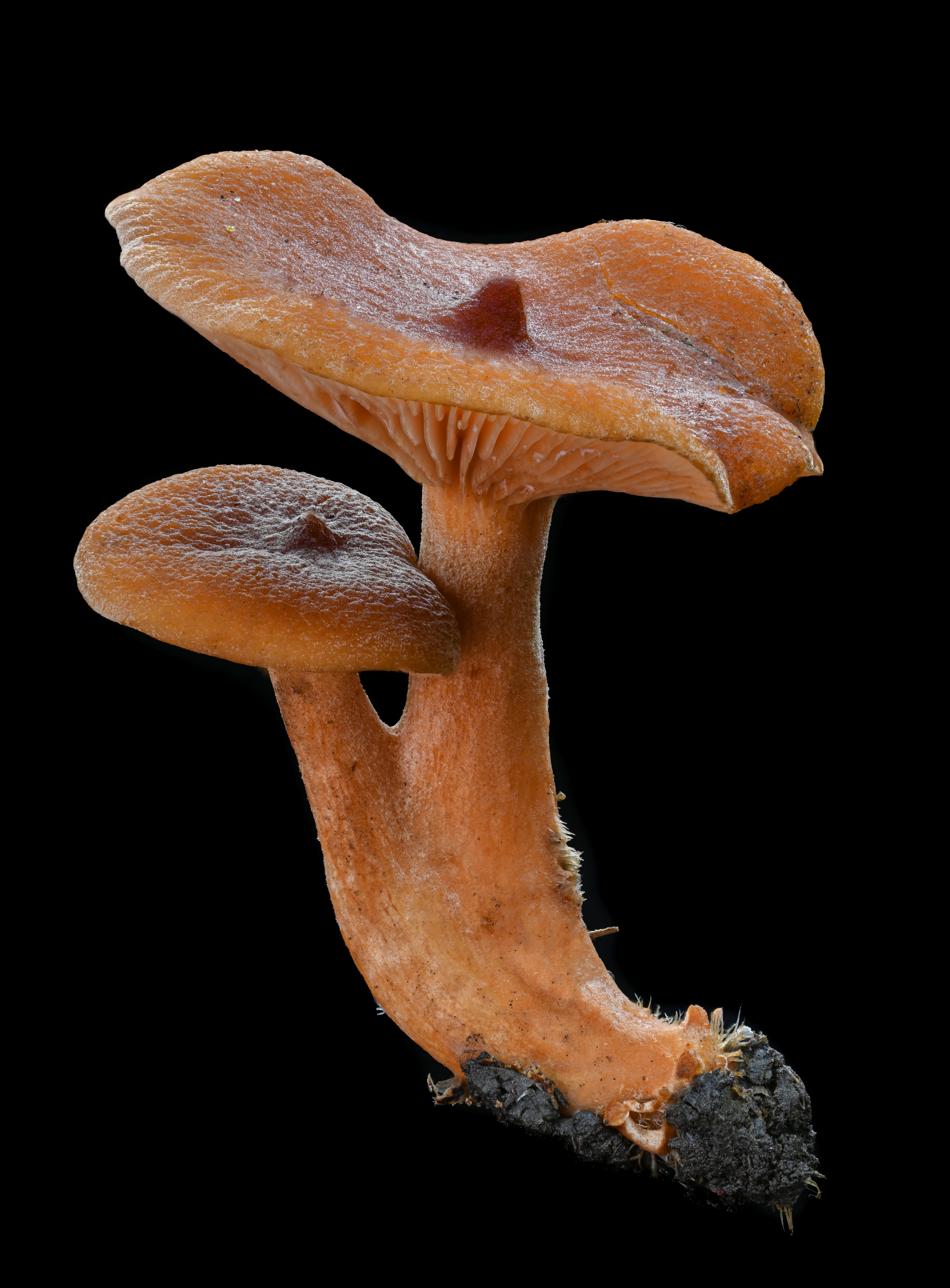
Lactarius rubidus

Candy caps are small to medium-size mushrooms, with a pileus ranging from 2–7 centimetres (3/4–2 3/4 in) in diameter, and colored orange-brown to reddish-brown. The pileus shape ranges from broadly convex in young specimens to plane to slightly depressed in older ones; lamellae are attached to subdecurrent. The stipe is 3–6 cm (1 1/4–2 1/4 in) long.

The entire fruiting body can be either firm or fragile and brittle. Like all members of Lactarius, the fruiting body exudes a latex when broken, which in these species is whitish and watery in appearance, and is often compared to whey or nonfat milk. The latex may have little flavor or may be slightly sweet, but should never taste bitter or acrid. These species are particularly distinguishable by their scent, which has been variously compared to maple syrup, camphor, curry, fenugreek, burnt sugar, Malt-O-Meal, or Maggi-Würze. This scent may be quite faint in fresh specimens, but typically becomes quite strong when the fruiting body is dried.

Microscopically, they share features typical of Lactarius, including round to slightly ovular spores with distinct amyloid ornamentation and sphaerocysts that are abundant in the pileus and stipe trama, but infrequent in the lamellar trama.

=== Chemistry ===
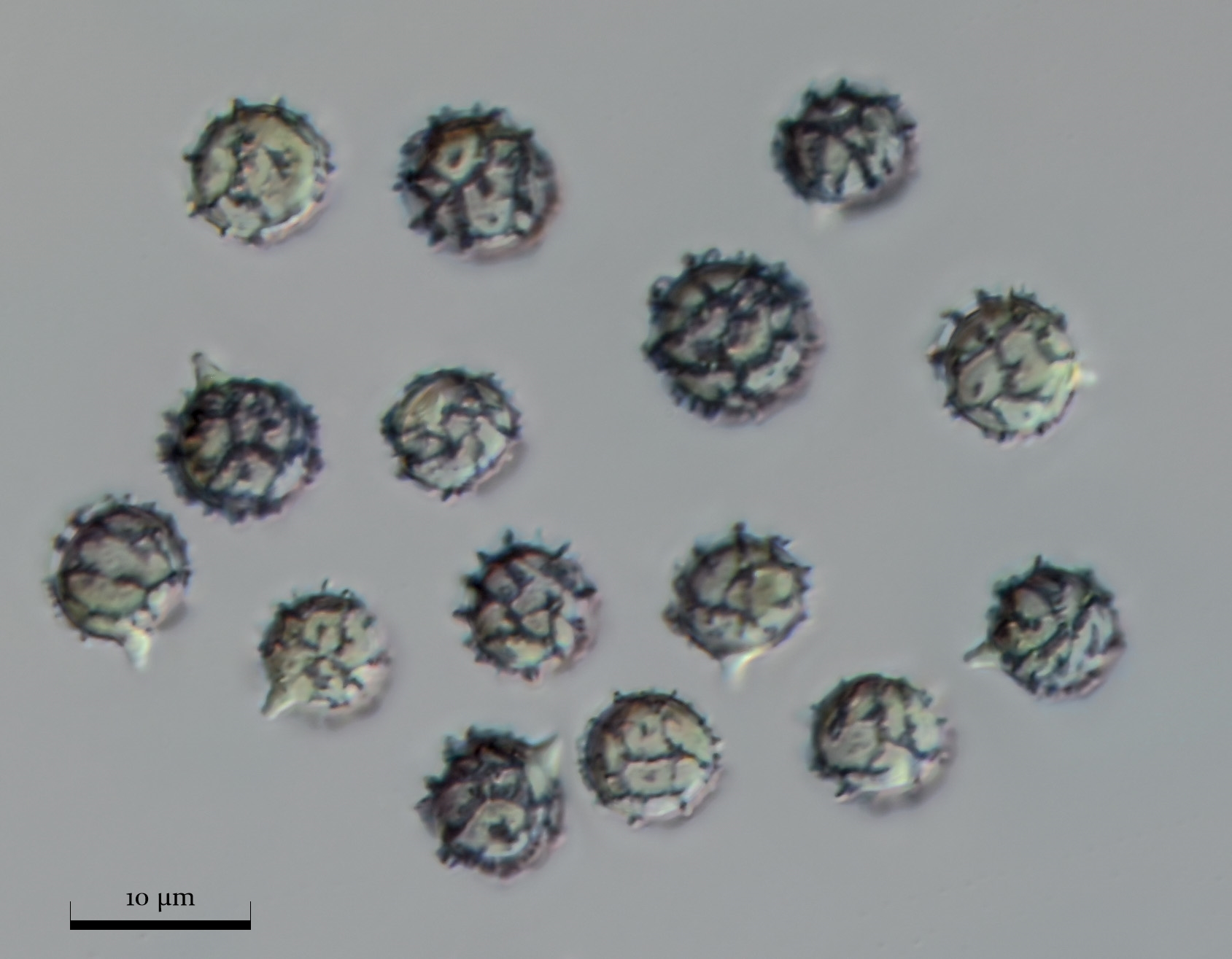
L. rubidus spores 1000x

The chemical responsible for the distinct odor of the candy cap was isolated in 2012 by chemical ecologist and natural product chemist William Wood of Humboldt State University, from collections of Lactarius rubidus. The odoriferous compound found in the fresh tissue and latex of the mushroom was found to be quabalactone III, an aromatic lactone. When the tissue and latex is dried, quabalactone III is hydrolyzed into sotolon, an even more powerfully aromatic compound, and one of the main compounds responsible for the aroma of maple syrup, as well as that of curry.

The question of what compound was responsible for the odor of candy cap had been under investigation by Wood and various students for a period of 27 years, when a mycology student in a class he was teaching asked what compound was responsible for the mushroom's odor, triggering investigation into the question. Isolation of the compound remained elusive, until solid-phase microextraction was used to extract the volatile compounds, which were then analyzed using gas chromatography–mass spectrometry.

Earlier investigation of the aromatic compounds of L. helvus by Rapor, et al. had also yielded sotolon (among a large number of other aromatic compounds), which was identified as giving this species its distinct fenugreek odor. Other important volatile compounds identified included decanoic acid and 2-methylbutyric acid.

Analysis of Lactarius camphoratus has shown that it contains 12-hydroxycaryophyllene-4,5-oxide, a caryophyllene compound. However, this was not identified as an aromatic component of this mushroom.

=== Identification ===
It is possible to mistake other distasteful or toxic species of mushrooms for candy caps or mistakenly include such species in a larger collection of candy caps. Those inexperienced with mushroom identification may mistake any number of "little brown mushrooms" (LBMs) for candy caps, including the deadly galerina (Galerina marginata and allies), which can occur in the same habitat. Candy caps can be distinguished from non-Lactarius species by their brittle stipe, while most other LBMs have a more flexible stipe. It is therefore recommended that candy caps be gathered by hand, breaking the fragile stipe in one's fingers. By this method, LBMs with a cartilaginous stipe will easily be distinguished.

Candy caps may also be confused with any of a large number of small, similarly colored species of Lactarius that may be distasteful to downright toxic depending on the species and the number consumed.

Candy caps may be distinguished from other Lactarius by the following characteristics:

- Odor: Candy caps have a distinctive odor (described above) that should not be present in other species of Lactarius. However, that other species of Lactarius may have different, but also distinctive, odors. Fresh candy caps (especially L. rubidus) may also not have a noticeable odor, limiting the utility of this characteristic. A sweet odor is much more evident after briefly singeing the flesh of a candy cap with a match or lighter, which can be useful for identification.
- Taste: The flesh and latex of candy caps should always be mild-tasting to somewhat sweet, lacking any hint of bitterness or acridity. Note, however, that there are some species of Lactarius, such as L. luculentus, where the bitterness is subtle and also may not be noticeable for a minute or so after tasting.
- Latex: The latex of candy caps appears thin and whey-like, like milk that has been mixed with water. This latex does not change color nor does it discolor the flesh of the mushroom. Other species of Lactarius have a distinctly white or colored latex, which in some species discolors the flesh of the mushroom.
- Pileus: Candy caps never have a zonate pattern of coloration on the surface of the pileus, nor is the pileus ever even slightly viscid.

=== Similar species ===
A number of species of Lactarius are distinctly aromatic, though only some of these species are thought to be closely related to the candy cap group.

The subsection Camphoratini includes Lactarius rostratus, a species found in northern Europe, though quite rare. Unlike other members of subsection Camphoratini, L. rostratus has an unpleasant (even nauseating) smell, described as resembling ivy. Lactarius cremor is a name sometimes used for mushrooms in this group, however, Heilmann-Clausen, et al. consider this name to be nomen dubium, referring variously to Lactarius rostratus, L. serifluus, or L. fulvissimus depending on the author's concept of L. cremor. Lactarius mukteswaricus and L. verbekenae, two species described from the Kumaon area of the Indian Himalaya in 2004, are reported to be very closely related to L. camphoratus, including in odor.

Lactarius rufulus is reported by one source as being a "candy cap" species and having a similar odor to the other candy caps, though earlier monographs do not report such an aroma and describe the flavor as subacrid.

Lactarius helvus and L. aquifluus, found in Europe and North America, respectively, are also strongly aromatic and similar to candy caps, the former having the odor of fenugreek. Lactarius helvus is known to be mildly toxic, causing gastrointestinal upset. The edibility of L. aquifluus is unknown, but as it is a close relative of L. helvus, it is suspected of being toxic. Lactarius species with yellow latex (or white latex that turns yellow) may be dangerous.

Lactarius glyciosmus and L. cocosiolens both have a distinct coconut odor. L. glyciosmus, however, has a subacrid flavor, though it is reported as having been gathered commercially in Scotland.

The most notable differences between L. camphoratus and L. rubidus
Attribute	L. camphoratus	L. rubidus
Image		
Pileus shape	Papilla sometimes present at disc	Papilla or umbo typically not present
Colour	Darker reddish-brown	More deep reddish-brown ("ferruginous")
Lamellae	More light yellowish to light orange	More light reddish
Spores	Ellipsoid to subglobose; 7.0–8.5 × 6.0–7.5 μm; ornamentation not connected (spines to short ridges)	Subglobose to globose; 6.0–8.5 × 6.0–8.0 μm; ornamentation semi-connected (broken to partial reticulum)
Odour	More curry-like	More maple-like; strong only upon drying
Distribution	Europe, Asia, eastern North America	Western North America; also reported from Costa Rica

== Distribution and habitat ==
Near the West Coast of North America, candy caps can be found from December through March.

== Ecology ==
Like other species of Lactarius, candy caps are generally thought to be ectotrophic, with L. camphoratus having been identified in ectomycorrhizal root tips. However, unusually for a mycorrhizal species, L. rubidus is also commonly observed growing directly on decaying conifer wood. All candy cap species seem to be associated with a range of tree species.

== Uses ==
Candy caps are not typically consumed in the same way most other edible mushrooms are consumed. Because of the strongly aromatic quality of these mushrooms, they are instead used primarily as a flavoring, much the way vanilla, saffron, or truffles are used. They impart a flavor and aroma to foods that has been compared to maple syrup or curry, but with a much stronger aroma than either of these seasonings. Candy caps are unique among edible mushrooms in that they are often used in sweet and dessert foods, such as cookies and ice cream. They are also sometimes used to flavor savory dishes that are traditionally prepared with sweet accompaniments, such as pork, and are also sometimes used in place of curry seasoning.

They are usually used in dried form, as the characteristic aroma intensifies greatly upon drying. To use them as a flavoring, the dried mushrooms are either powdered or they are infused into one of the liquid ingredients used in the dish, for example, being steeped in hot milk, much the same way whole vanilla beans are.

As a result of these culinary properties, candy caps are highly sought after by many chefs. Lactarius rubidus is commercially gathered and sold in California while L. camphoratus is gathered and sold in the United Kingdom and Yunnan, China.

Marchand reports that some individuals use L. camphoratus as part of a pipe tobacco mix.

== See also ==
- List of Lactarius species
