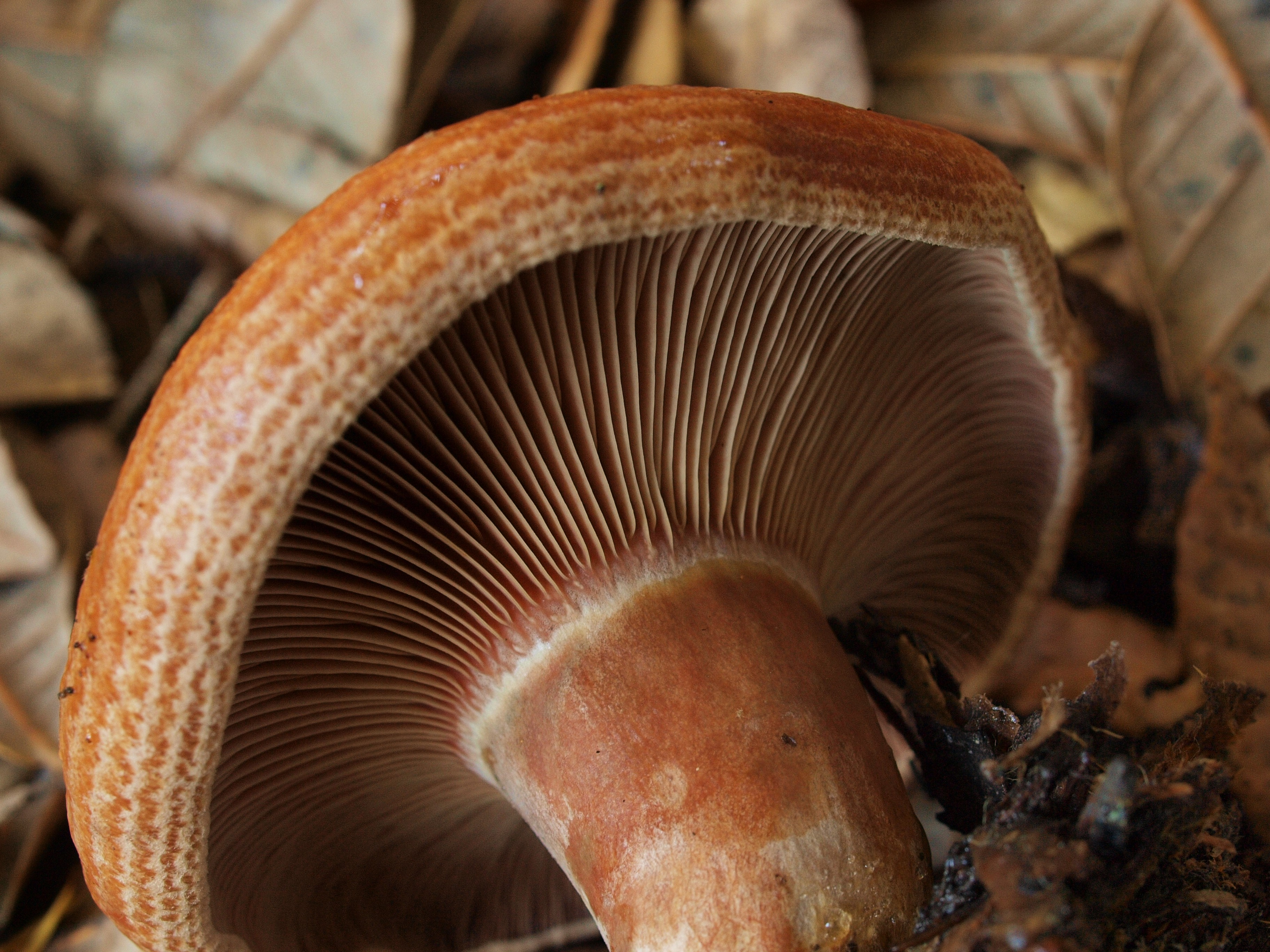
- Cap underside

Scientific classification
- Kingdom: Fungi
- Division: Basidiomycota
- Class: Agaricomycetes
- Order: Russulales
- Family: Russulaceae
- Genus: Lactarius
- Species: L. rubrilacteus

Binomial name
- Lactarius rubrilacteus Hesler & A.H.Sm. (1979)

= Lactarius rubrilacteus =

Species of fungus

Lactarius rubrilacteus
- Mycological characteristics
- Gills on hymenium
- Cap is convex
- Hymenium is decurrent
- Stipe is bare
- Spore print is cream
- Ecology is mycorrhizal
- Edibility is edible

Lactarius rubrilacteus is a species of fungus of the genus Lactarius. It is also known as the bleeding milkcap. The mushroom is typically orangish-brown but bruises green. The cap is 6–14 centimetres (2 1/4–5 1/2 in) wide and the stem up to 6 cm long. The flesh often exudes a latex when cut and the spore print is beige.

Growing in western North America under conifers from summer to fall, the mushroom is edible but of low interest due to its grainy texture.

== Description ==
The mushroom can have either an orangish-brown or a bluish-green hue. It bruises green, and is more commonly greenish in old, damaged, or unexpanded specimens (e.g. a "button" at the base). It has many laticifers which appear as a white network across its surface.

The cap of the mushroom is convex, sometimes shield-shaped, and 6–14 centimetres (2 1/4–5 1/2 in) across; it also has quite an underfolded margin and a depressive disk. The stem is coloured like the cap, up to 6 cm long and 2.5 cm thick.

When sliced or cut, the mushroom flesh will typically release a dark red to purple latex or milky substance. The flesh will lose colour when damaged, and is usually granular or brittle to the touch. The fungus exudes a slight odour that is faintly aromatic.

The spores are creamy white or yellow and ellipsoid in shape. The spore print is beige.

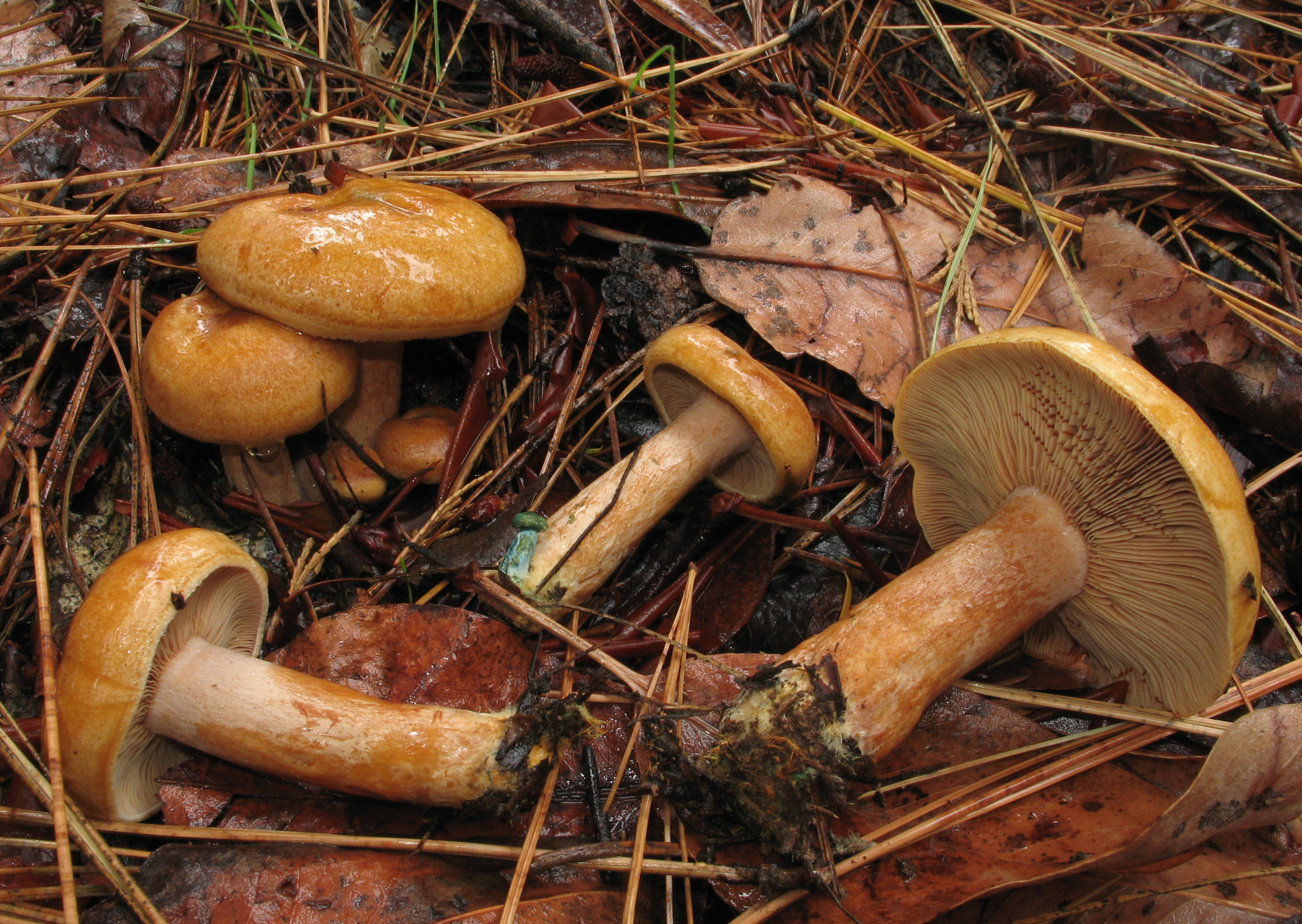
Group of mushrooms

=== Chemical reactivity ===
- Potassium hydroxide: When the mushroom comes in contact with potassium hydroxide, most of the mushroom, including the mantle and ectomycorrhizae, loses its bluish hue and becomes a dull brown.
- Melzer's reagent: Hardly any visible reaction on any part of the mushroom occurs. This particular mushroom appears to have little reactivity to Melzer's Reagent.
- Sulfovanillin: Most of the mushroom becomes a reddish-brown color, but the oldest roots of the fungi stay unaltered by contact with sulfovanillin.

=== Similar species ===
Lactarius deliciosus is a related species, but its cap differs in appearance. L. sanguifluus is similar, perhaps even synonymous, and is mycorrhizal with pine in Europe. Additionally, L. barrowsii, L. paradoxus and L. subpurpureus may be similar.

== Distribution and habitat ==
The mushroom is primarily found in parts of western North America, growing in forests and on the ground. The mushroom usually finds cover under conifer trees, mainly Douglas-fir. It is widely distributed in these areas between the months of June and October.

== Uses ==
The mushroom is edible, but has a grainy texture and is of little interest. It is recommended to roast or bake it slowly in order to prevent it from being too grainy.

== See also ==
- List of Lactarius species
