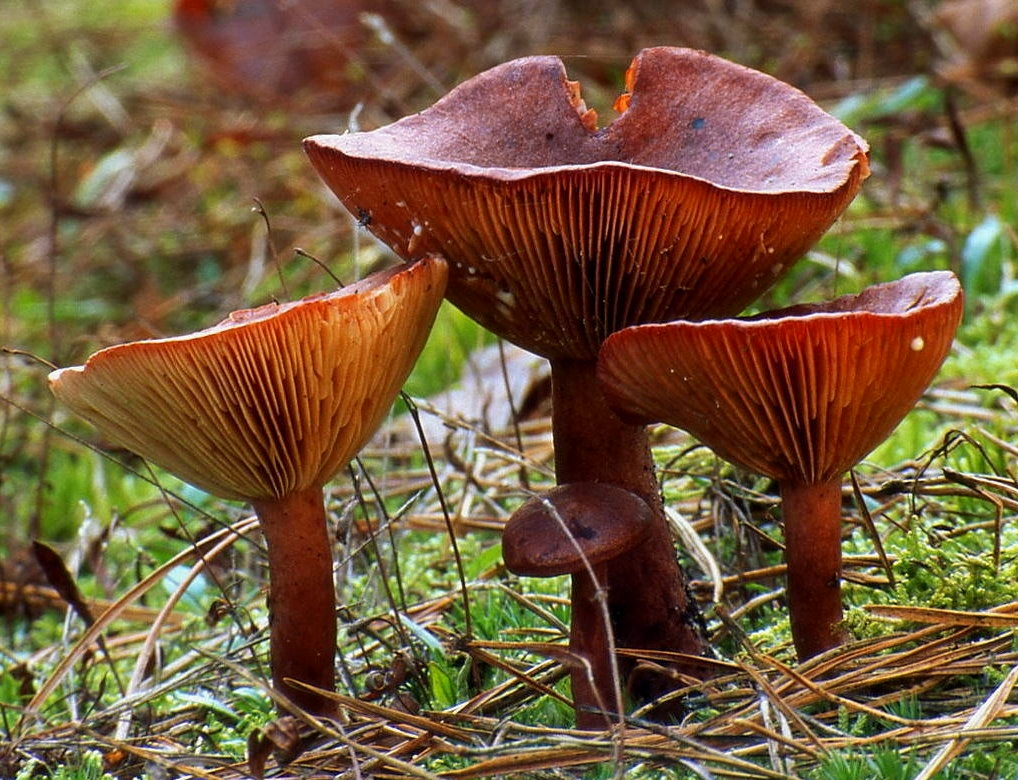

Conservation status
- Secure (NatureServe)

Scientific classification
- Kingdom: Fungi
- Division: Basidiomycota
- Class: Agaricomycetes
- Order: Russulales
- Family: Russulaceae
- Genus: Lactarius
- Species: L. rufus

Binomial name
- Lactarius rufus (Scop.) Fr.

= Lactarius rufus =

Species of fungus

Lactarius rufus
- Mycological characteristics
- Gills on hymenium
- Cap is convex
- Hymenium is decurrent
- Stipe is bare
- Spore print is white
- Edibility is not recommended

Lactarius rufus is a common, medium-sized member of the mushroom genus Lactarius, whose many members are commonly known as milkcaps. It is known by the common name of the peppery milk cap, rufous milkcap, or the red hot milk cap in North America. It is dark brick red in color, and grows with pine or birch trees. It is suspected of being poisonous but has some regional culinary uses.

== Taxonomy ==
Described originally by Giovanni Antonio Scopoli, and later by the Swedish father of modern mycology Elias Magnus Fries. The specific epithet rufus is a reference to its colour.

== Description ==
The cap is up to 10 centimetres (4 in) in diameter. It is dark brick, bay, or red-brown. At first it is convex, and often has a small central boss (umbo), but later flattens, eventually acquiring a shallow central depression. The surface is dry and matt. The concolorous, but paler stem often becomes hollow with age. The gills are slightly decurrent, cream, becoming coloured as the cap later, only paler. The spore print is creamy white, with a slight salmon tinge. The flesh is white, as is the (abundant) milk, which tastes mild initially, gradually becoming very hot, and acrid after a minute or so.

== Distribution and habitat ==
Lactarius rufus appears from late spring to late autumn. It is frequent in the northern temperate zones in Europe and North America. It is most commonly found with pine trees, but can also appear with birch, conifer, or spruce. It is common in northern California, and the Pacific Northwest from late summer to early winter.

== Edibility ==
Lactarius rufus is generally not recommended for consumption, even being considered poisonous due to the presence of toxins which may cause gastric upset. However, it is used in some places as a condiment after special treatment. Mycologist David Arora notes that it is eaten in Scandinavian countries after canning, but may be poisonous raw, being especially untested in North America. As of 1984, it was one of the most common wild mushrooms harvested for food use in Finland.

== See also ==
- List of Lactarius species
