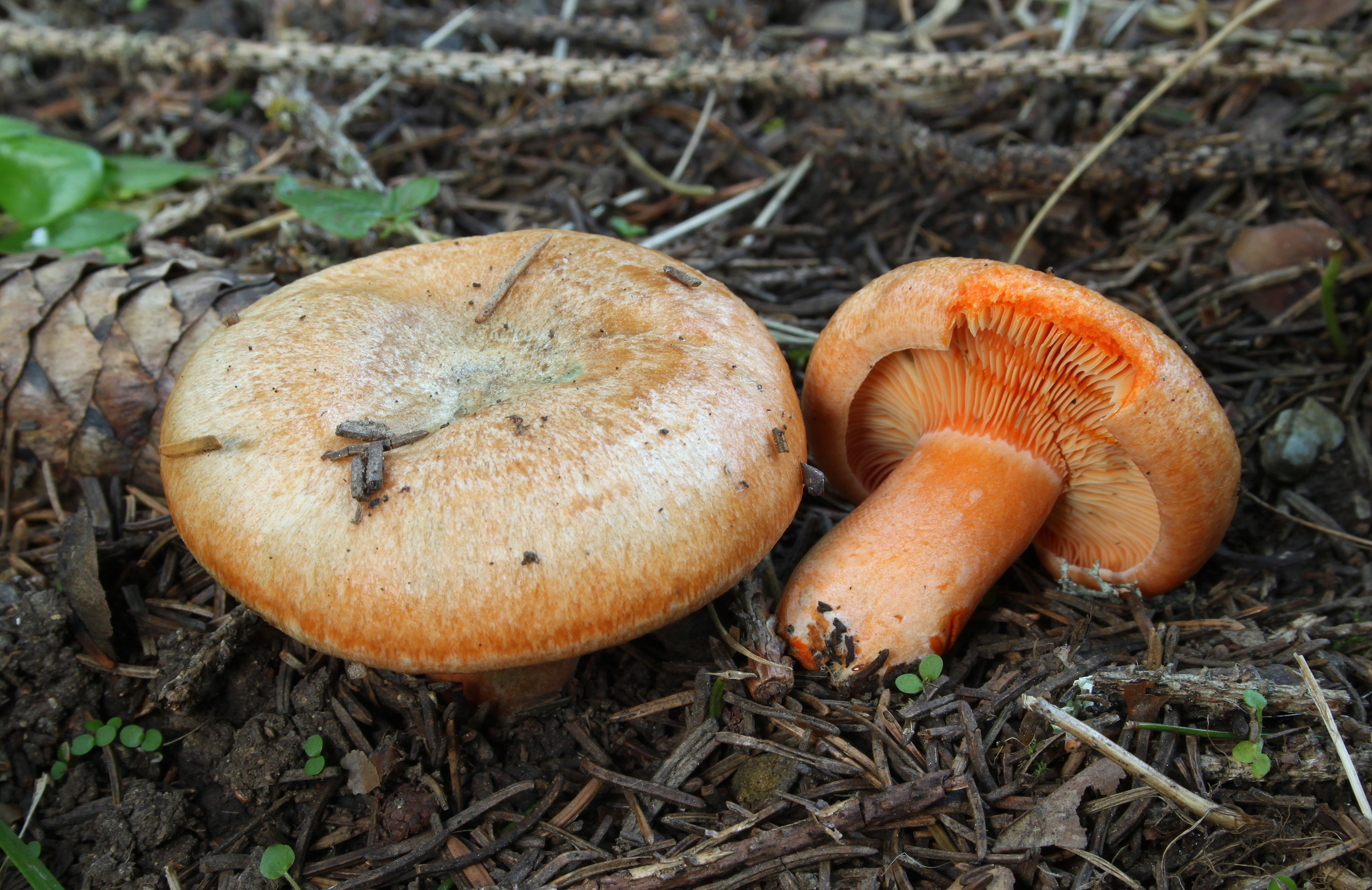

Scientific classification
- Kingdom: Fungi
- Division: Basidiomycota
- Class: Agaricomycetes
- Order: Russulales
- Family: Russulaceae
- Genus: Lactarius
- Species: L. deterrimus

Binomial name
- Lactarius deterrimus Gröger (1968)

Synonyms
- Lactarius deliciosus var. piceus Smotl. (1947); Lactarius deliciosus var. deterrimus (Gröger) Hesler & A.H.Sm. (1979)

= Lactarius deterrimus =

Species of fungus

Lactarius deterrimus
- Mycological characteristics
- Gills on hymenium
- Cap is depressed or convex
- Hymenium is decurrent
- Stipe is bare
- Spore print is tan
- Ecology is mycorrhizal
- Edibility is edible

Lactarius deterrimus, also known as false saffron milkcap or orange milkcap, is a species of fungus in the family Russulaceae. The fungus produces medium-sized fruit bodies (mushrooms) with orangish caps up to 12 centimetres (4 1/2 inches) wide that develop green spots in old age or if injured. Its orange-coloured latex stains maroon within 30 minutes.

Lactarius deterrimus is a mycorrhizal fungus that associates with Norway spruce and bearberry. The species is distributed in Europe, but has also found in parts of Asia. A visually similar species in the United States and Mexico is not closely related to the European species. The fruit bodies appear between late June and November, usually in spruce forests. Although the fungus is edible—like all Lactarius mushrooms from the section Deliciosi—its taste is often bitter, and it is not highly valued. The fruit bodies are used as source of food for the larvae of several insect species. Lactarius deterrimus can be distinguished from similar Lactarius species by difference in the mycorrhizal host or latex colour.

== Taxonomy ==
Although the fungus is one of the most common in Central Europe, the species was not validly described until 1968 by German mycologist Frieder Gröger. Before this, L. deterrimus was regarded as a variety of L. deliciosus (L. deliciosus var. piceus, described by Miroslav Smotlacha in 1946). After Roger Heim and A. Leclair described L. semisanguifluus in 1950, this fungus was referred to as the latter. L. fennoscandicus was separated from L. deterrimus in 1998 by Annemieke T. Verbeken and Jan Vesterholt and was classified as a separate species.

The epithet of deterrimus is Latin, and was chosen by Gröger to highlight the poor gustatory properties of the mushroom, such as the bitter aftertaste and often heavy maggot infestations. The superlative of "dēterior" (meaning less good) means "the worst, the poorest". The mushroom is commonly known as the "false saffron milkcap".

Several molecular phylogenetic analyses show that L. deterrimus, L. sanguifluus, Lactarius vinosus and L. fennoscandicus form a group of related species, which might include the North American species L. paradoxus and L. miniatosporus. Although L. deliciosus var. deterrimus qualifies as synonym for L. deterrimus, the families that had been characterized in North America as Lactarius deliciosus var. deterrimus are not closely related with the European types. They also seem not to form a monophyletic group.

Lactarius deterrimus belongs to the section Deliciosi of the genus Lactarius. According to molecular phylogenetics studies, this section forms a definite phylogenetic group within the milk cap relatives. Deliciosi species mainly have an orange or reddish-coloured latex and taste mild to slightly bitter. They are strict mycorrhizal associates of conifers. The next closest relative of L. deterrimus is L. fennoscandicus.

== Description ==
=== Macroscopic characteristics ===
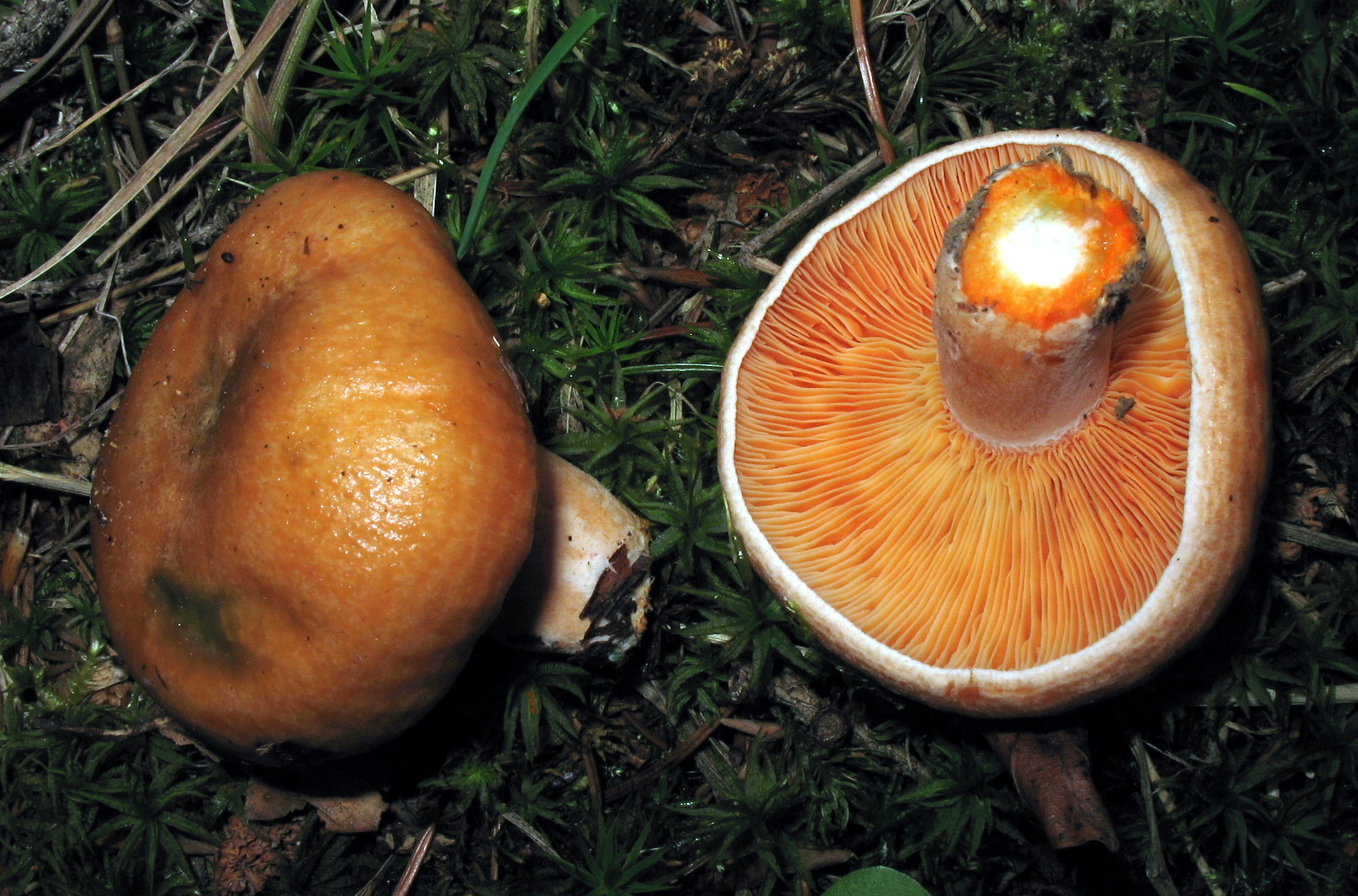
While the caps of old fruit bodies are usually funnel-shaped, young specimens have more rounded caps.

The cap is 3 to 10 cm (1 to 4 in), rarely up to 12 cm (4 1/2 in) wide and more or less centrifugal-shaped and round. It is at early stage convex, furled on the edge, and depressed in the centre. Later it is flat, funnel-shaped, and depressed. The cap skin is bare, greasy in moist weather and slightly shiny when dry. The cap is tangerine to orange-brown, darker zoned towards the edges and dulls mainly yellow-brown. In old age or after cold or frost it changes the colour more or less to dirty greenish or green-spotted.

The dense, bow-like lamellae are pale-orange to pale-ochre and on the stipe basifixed or slightly decurrent. They are brittle and intermixed with shorter lamellulae (short gills that do not extend fully from the cap margin to the stem) as well as partly forking near the stem. In old age or in cases of injury they receive initially dark red, later grey green spots. The spore print is pale ochre.

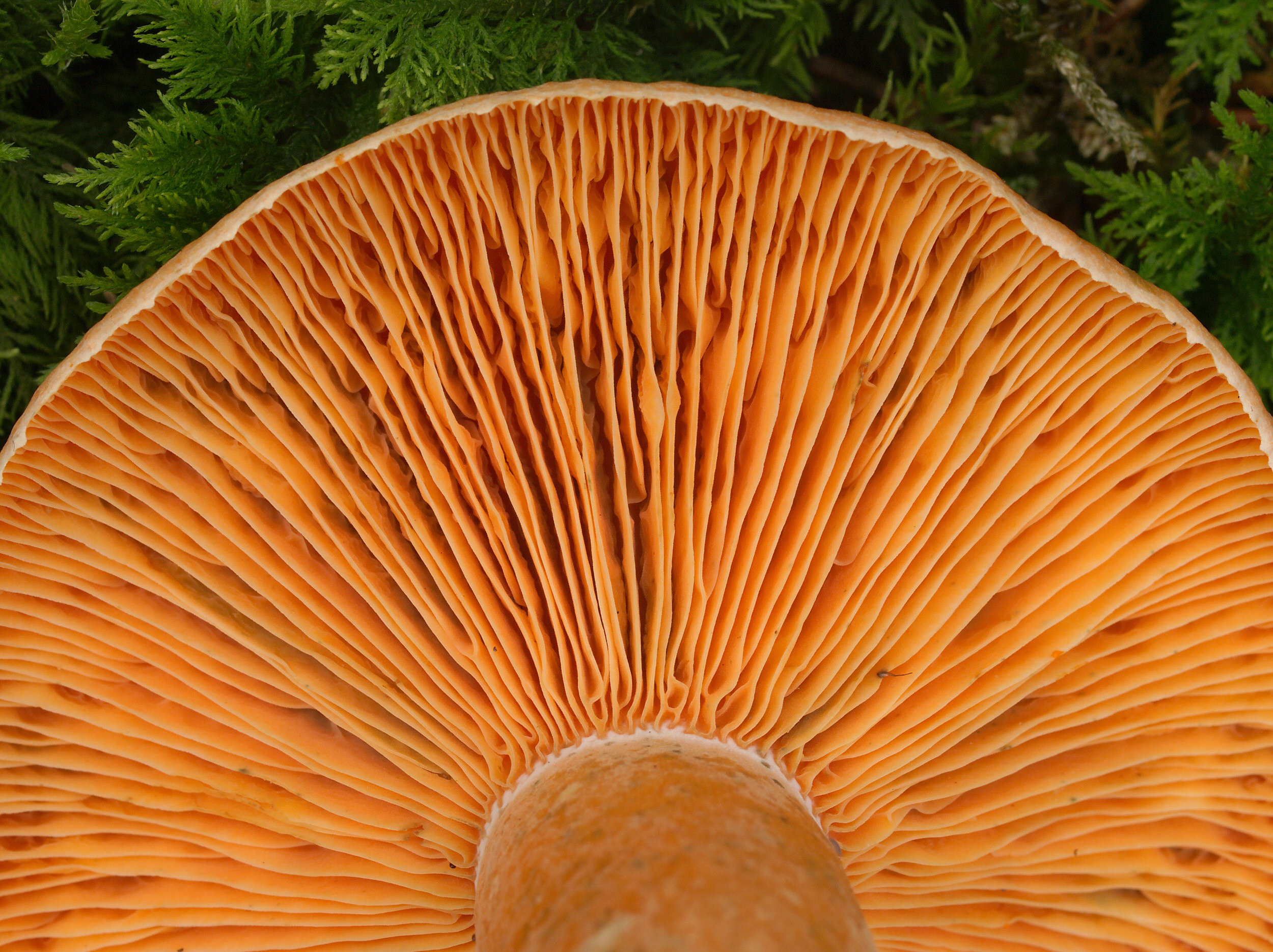
Detail of the cap underside with the predominantly orange coloured, partially crossconnected gills

The mainly long and cylindrical stipe is reddish orange. It is 4 to 8 cm (1 1/2 to 3 in) (rarely 10 cm (4 in)) long, 1 to 1.5 cm (3/8 to 5/8 in) wide and barely foveate or blotchy. On the basis it is often slightly thickened or pompous and becomes hollow inside. A bloomy circular zones is found on the lamella disposition.

The milk is first carrot-red and becomes a maroon colour within 10 to 30 minutes. The brittle and pale-yellowish flesh is often infested with maggots. If cut or injured it becomes, as the milk, first carrot-red, then maroon and within hours dirty green. The fruit body smells harsh, fruit-like and first tastes mild, but then slightly resinous-bitter and nearly spicy or somewhat astringent.

=== Microscopic characteristics ===
The rotund to ellipsoid spores are 7.5–10 μm long and 6–7.6 μm wide. The surface ornamentation extends to 0.5 μm high and is mainly from warts and short, wide ridges, which are linked through few fine lines to form an incomplete net (reticulum). The suprahilar area, a distinctly limited zone above the apiculus, is weakly amyloid. Basidia (spore-bearing cells) are four-spored and measure 45–60 × 9.5–12 μm. They are roughly cylindrical to somewhat club-shaped and often have an oil droplet or a granular body. The sterigmata are 4.5–5.5 μm long. The thin-walled pleurocystidia are sparse, but somewhat common near the gill edge. They are protruded and are 45–65 μm long and 5–8 μm wide, they are sometimes smaller near the gill edge. Nearly spindle-shaped, they are often straightened or constricted like a string of pearls at the apex. The body is often fine and grained.

Pseudocystidia are largely present. They are 4–6 μm wide and are sometimes protruded, but are often shorter than the basidioles (basidia in the early developmental stage). The basidioles are cylindric to spiral and have an ochre-coloured substance, similar to the laticifers. Near the top they are, however, almost hyaline (transparent). The gill edge is usually sterile and has a few to many cheilocystidia. The thin-walled cheiloleptocystidia are 15–25 μm long and 5–10 μm wide. They are almost club-shaped or irregularly shaped and transparent, and often contain a granular material. The cheilomacrocystidia are also thin-walled and measure 25–50 μm long and 6–8 μm wide. They are slightly spindle-shaped and often have a tip resembling a string of pearls; their interior is hyaline or granular. Laticifers are abundant, striking and body is ochre coloured. The cuticle of the cap is an ixocutis, whereby the hyphae are linked in a jellylike matrix, that can swell up in moisture to become heavily slimy.

=== Similar species ===
The likewise very common Lactarius deliciosus is similar in appearance. Lactarius deterrimus differs basically from the first because its flesh becomes reddish within 10 minutes and in about 30 minutes dark maroon, caused by the discolouration of the milk. The milk of L. deliciosus stays orange or becomes reddish within 30 minutes. Also, the milk of the latter tastes mild, while the milk of the first distinctly bitter. The cap of L. deterrimus changes its colour in old age or if injured distinctly greenish and is common only under spruces, while L. deliciosus is native under pines.

Even more similar is the very rare Lactarius semisanguifluus. Its milk also discolours within 5 to 8 minutes to maroon. The cap of older fruit bodies is nearly completely greenish. It is also common under pines. The most similar and also the most closely related fungus is Lactarius fennoscandicus, a boreal to subalpine species. Its cap is distinctly zoned and brown-orange. Sometimes the cap has purple-grey tones. The stem is pale to blunt orange-ochre.

Lactarius lookalikes
L. deliciosus	L. semisanguifluus	L. fennoscandicus

== Distribution and habitat ==
Lactarius deterrimus is mainly distributed in Europe, but the fungus has also found in areas of Asia (Turkey, India, Pakistan). According to recent molecular biologic research, the similar North American species from the United States and Mexico are not closely related to the European species. In Europe, the fungus is especially common in Northern, North-East and Central Europe; in the UK, it may be found from July through to November. In the south and west it is common in mountainous areas. In the east, its range extends to Russia.

== Ecology ==
Lactarius deterrimus has traditionally been considered to have a strict mycorrhizal host specificity with Norway spruce. In 2006, it was reported that the fungus can also form arbutoid mycorrhiza with bearberry (Arctostaphylos uva-ursi). Arbutoid mycorrhizal associations are variants of ectomycorrhiza found in certain plants in the Ericaceae characterised by hyphal coils in epidermal cells. The mycorrhiza formed by L. deterrimus on both bearberry and Norway spruce show typical features such as a hyphal mantle and a Hartig net; the distinguishing characteristic between the mycorrhizal symbioses with the different hosts is that the hyphae penetrate the epidermal cells of bearberry, although there are also some differences in the form of the Hartig net, branching pattern, and colour. Although bearberry has been shown to form mycorrhiza with a wide range of fungi both in the field and in laboratory experiments, it had never previously been known to form mycorrhiza with fungi thought to be strictly host-specific. Bearberry may function as a nurse plant to help re-establish Norway spruce in deforested areas.

The species is common in spruce-fir and spruce-moorland forests and in spruce forests and plantations. Together with spruces, the fungus is also common in different European beech and oak-European hornbeam forests, but also on the forest edges, on clearings and in clearcut meadows and even on juniper heathers and in parkland. There are scarcely any habitats where the spruce is common, while the fungus is not found there. The fungus is very common in young spruce forests that are 10 to 20 years old, where it occurs on forest path edges occasionally in masses.

The fungus probably favours calcareous soil, although it has been found on nearly every soil type. It appears on sand, peat, limestone soils, rankers and Cambisols. It endures acidic as well as alkaline and low-nutrient to relatively high-nutrient soils. Heavily eutrophic soils are inappropriate for its habitat.

The fruit bodies appear from late June to November, but usually from August to October; overwintered specimens can be found in freezing days up to early February. The fungus prefers the downs and the uplands, but is also not uncommon in lowlands.

=== Fruit body ===
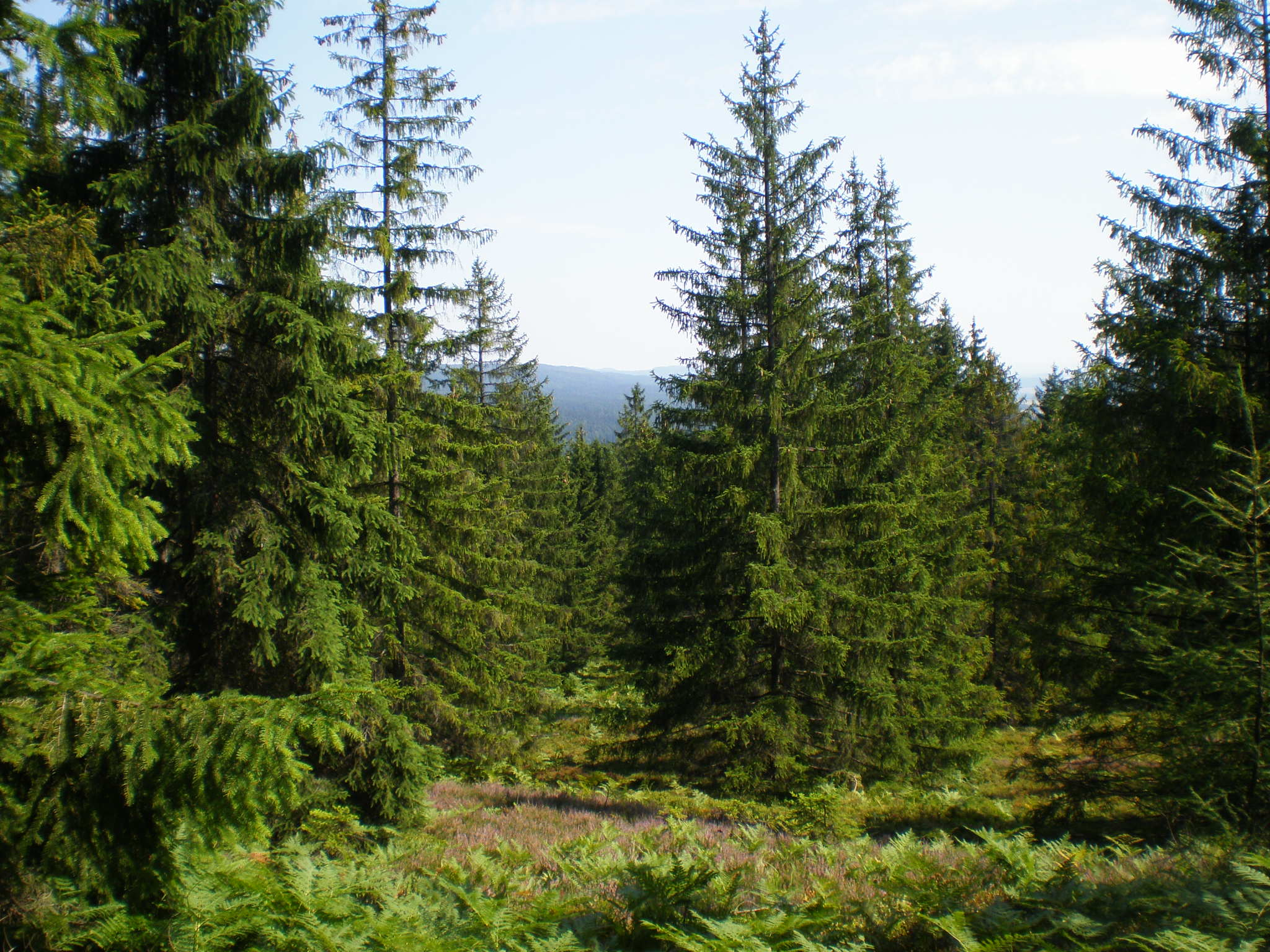
L. deterrimus is a mycorrhizal fungus that lives in symbiosis with spruces.

Many fungi can serve as source of food for insect larvae, whereas most insects eat fungi only occasionally. Still, a whole range of insect species specialize on fungi. These animals are mainly beetle larvae, especially hairy fungus beetles (Mycetophagidae), rove beetles (Staphylinidae), and true flies (Diptera). Milk caps are especially attractive for true flies, while beetle larvae are comparatively rarer. The most common insects found on the fungus are Mycetophilidae and Phoridae larvae, which populate even the youngest fruit bodies. Also relatively common on mature or overaged fruit bodies are Drosophilidae and Psychodidae. Species from the section Deliciosi are often infested by Diptera larvae.

The following species have been isolated from the fruit bodies of L. deterrimus:

- Ula sylvatica (Pediciidae): This very common Micropezidae were isolated from more than 70 different fungus species, which belong to completely different genera and families. Its larvae spend an unusually long portion of its life cycle in the fruit body, usually three or four weeks.
- Mycetophila blanda (Mycetophilidae): The Mycetophilidae cultivates usually in milk caps of the section Deliciosi.
- Mycetophila estonica (Mycetophilidae): A rare species first described in 1992, which is closely related with Mycetophila blanda and is also common in milk caps.
- Mycetophila evanida (Mycetophilidae): Was found in fungi including Lactarius fulvissimus and Russula luteotacta.
- Culicoides scoticus (Ceratopogonidae): It is one of the most common biting midges found in fungi and been found in over 20 different fungus species.
- Mydaea corni: This species belongs to the family Muscidae and was to date only found in species of Lactarius and Russula.
- Many different fruit flies have been recorded on L. deterrimus: Drosophila funebris, Drosophila phalerata, Drosophila transversa and Drosophila testacea.
- Psychoda albipennis, Psychoda lobata and Tinearia alternata were isolated from the fruit bodies of the fungus. The larvae of Psychoda lobata are known to develop from a wide range of fungus species from over 30 genera.

=== Parasitism ===
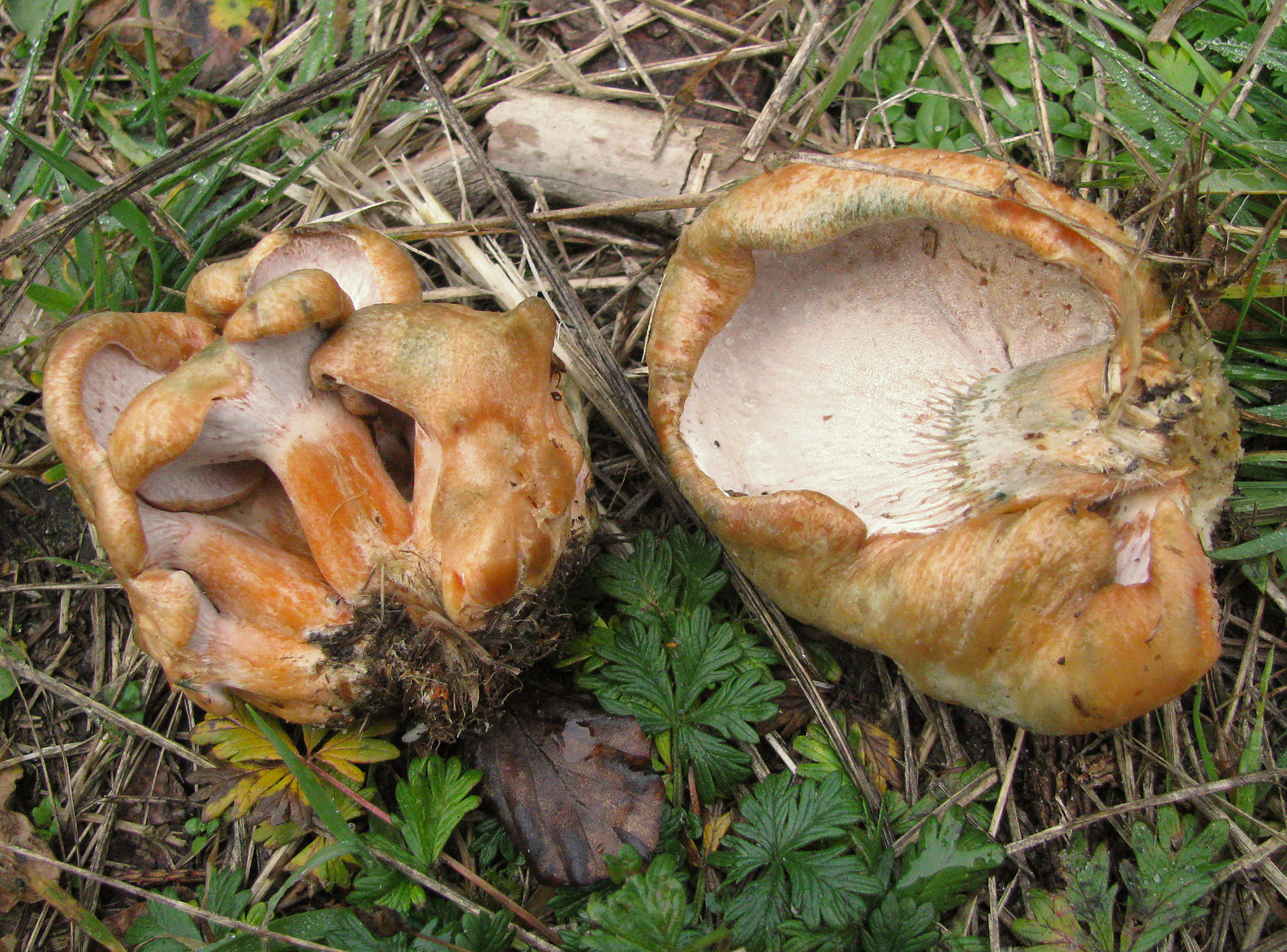
The deformed fruit bodies of L. deterrimus are infested by Hypomyces lateritius.

Abnormally developed milk caps infested by the parasitic sac fungus Hypomyces lateritius (syn. Peckialla laterita) are occasionally found in summer and autumn. The infested fruit bodies are usually more or less heavily malformed with a harder and more solid flesh than typical fruit bodies, so that they are more resistant to rot and can even survive the winter. They do not create gills; instead, the cap bottom is covered by an initially soft, white hyphen fungus, also known as a subiculum. Early on the mycelia becomes denser and takes on a white-grey colour. The perithecia are created after about 10–14 days. Perithecia are fruit bodies of the Hypomyces and other sac fungi, in which the spindle-shaped asci are produced. Besides L. deterrimus, L. deliciosus and L. sanguifluus can become infested, rarely other milk caps. Hypomyces lateritius, H. ochraceus, H. rosellus, H. odoratus, among other Hypomyces species live parasitically on different milk caps and brittlegills as well as on the fruit bodies of species from other genera.

== Importance ==
=== Edibility ===
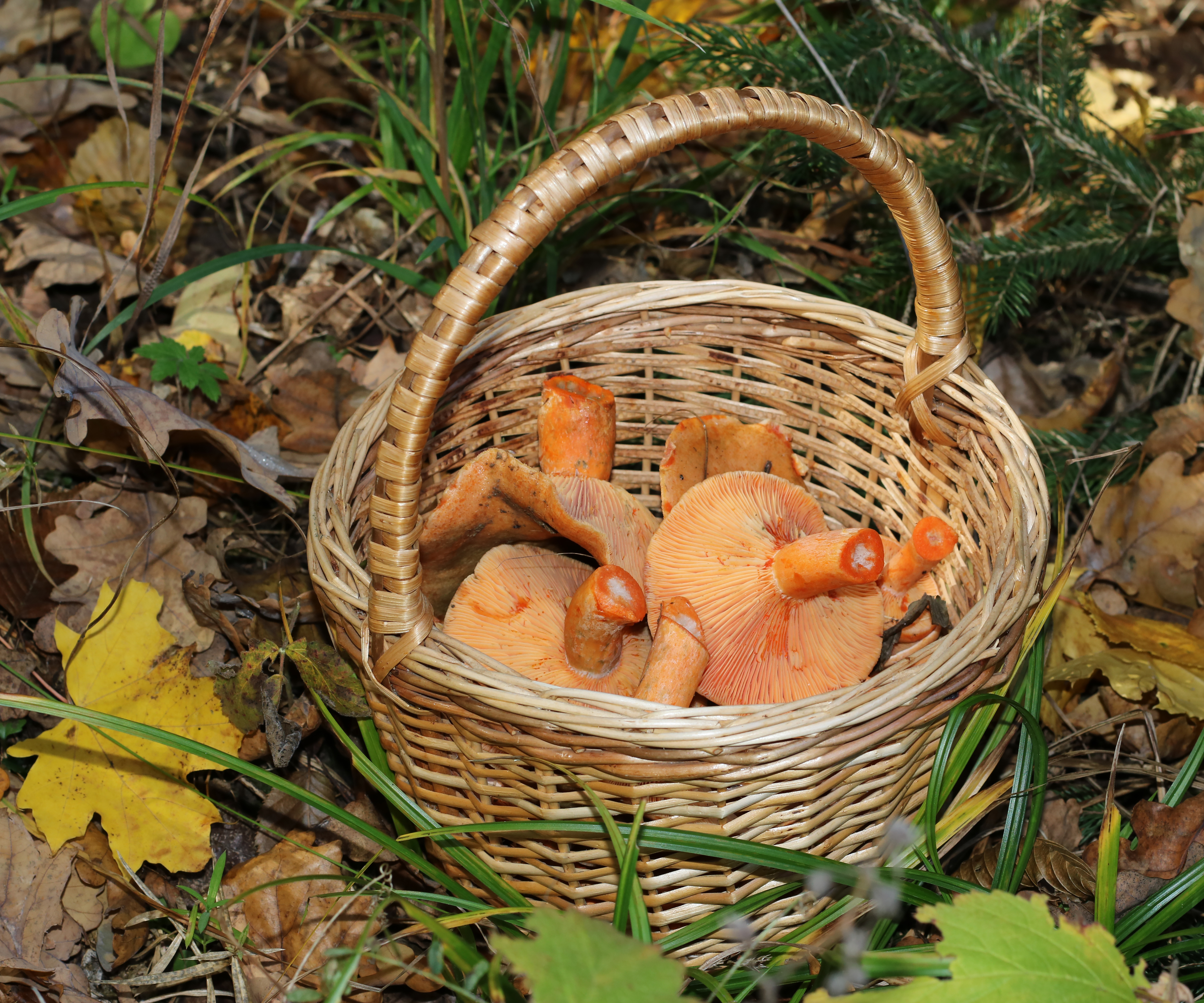
Picked mushrooms in a basket. Ukraine

Lactarius deterrimus is an edible mushroom, but is much less appreciated than the similar L. deliciosus. The first tastes slightly bitter and is often infested by maggots. Like L. deliciosus, this fungus is mainly stir-fried in butter or oil; if it is cooked in water, the flesh becomes very soft. Young fruit bodies can be also pickled, or dried for later use. As the fungus is often heavily infested by maggots, skilled mushroom pickers prefer young fruit bodies. The urine discolours to red if a large amount of milk caps are eaten, but this is entirely harmless and is not evidence for an impairment to health. The red-coloured azulene compounds, ingested with the mushroom food, are more or less excreted with the urine.

=== Contents ===
The milk cap's fruit bodies have a characteristic orange milk juice (latex). The guaiane sesquiterpenes are responsible for the orange colour. Sesquiterpenes are terpenes composed of three isoprene units and therefore have 15 carbon atoms. Sesquiterpenes are widely distributed in nature and are found in plants as well as animals, for example in the juvenile hormone of insects. Plants use sesquiterpenes as a defense compound against insects. According to some studies, sesquiterpenes have antibiotic, anticarcinogenic, or immunostimulant effects.

Young, uninjured fruit bodies of L. deterrimus have sesquiterpenoides in the form of fatty acid dihydroazulene-esters. About 85% of the yellow-coloured dihydroazulene are esterified with stearic acid and about 15% with linoleic acid. If the fruit body is injured, the free sesquiterpene – a dihydroazulene alcohol – is released enzymatically. Several products are produced from it through oxidation: the yellow-coloured aldehyde delicial (1-formyl-6, 7-dihydro-4-methyl-7-isopropenylazulene), the purple-coloured aldehyde lactarovioline (1-formyl-4-methyl-7-isopropenylazulene), and the blue-coloured alcohol deterrol (1-hydroxymethyl-4-methyl-7-isopropenylazulene). The milk is first maroon through mixing with the different colours and discolours green. The dihydroazulene alcohol and delicial are unstable compounds, which react to form further products. Delicial polymerises particularly slight.

== See also ==
- List of Lactarius species
