= Frieder Gröger =

German mycologist (1934–2018)

Frieder Gröger (June 15, 1934 - December 6, 2018) was a German mycologist from Berlin. His official author citation is "Gröger".

== Life ==
Frieder Gröger was a teacher for fifteen years until abandoning his job. After that he earned a living partly as a district fungus expert. Besides he was freelance active, mainly literary. Furthermore, he devoted himself to mushroom hunting, the alienation of the grouped goods, flower propagation and selling flowers and onions.

Gröger significantly designed the Mykologische Mitteilungsblatt Halle, which was distributed to the mushroom surveyors from East Germany. Beyond that he actively worked on the fungus-themed journal Boletus, which was later combined with the other journal in the 199ßs under this name unter dem Titel. Until he reached the age of 65 he proofreaded, reworked the manuscripts and performed paperwork. At this time his membership in the Federal Committee Mycology of the Naturschutzbund Deutschland (NABU). From then on he concentrated himself for the development of determination tables. First planned as Beiheft zur Zeitschrift für Mykologie, the first part of the 2006 journal Bestimmungsschlüssel für Blätterpilze und Röhrlinge in Europa was released as the 13th volume of the Regensburger Mykologischen Schriften.

He is member of the Pilzkundlichen Arbeitsgemeinschaft Berlin-Brandenburg e.V. (PABB).

== Works (selection) ==
=== Books ===
- with Franz Engel: Pilzwanderungen. Eine Pilzkunde für jedermann. 23rd edition. A. Ziemsen, Wittenberg Lutherstadt 1989. 215 pages. ISBN 978-3740300388.
- Pilze und Wildfrüchte selbst gesammelt und zubereitet. 3rd edition. Verlag für die Frau, Leipzig 1985. 144 pages. ASIN B001C3Q1TS.
- with Alfred Birkfeld and Kurt Herschel: Pilze - Essbar oder giftig? 23rd edition, revised edition. A. Ziemsen, Wittenberg Lutherstadt 1990. 72 pages. ISBN 978-3740302450.
- Bestimmungsschlüssel für Blätterpilze und Röhrlinge in Europa. Teil I: Hauptschlüssel; Gattungsschlüssel; Artenschlüssel für Röhrlinge und Verwandte, Wachsblättler, hellblättrige Seitlinge, Hellblättler und Rötlinge. In: Regensburger Mykologische Schriften 13. Regensburgische Botanische Gesellschaft 2006. ISSN 0944-2820.

=== Single publications ===
- Zur Kenntnis von Lactarius semisanguifluus Heim et Leclair. In: Westfälische Pilzbriefe 7. pp. 3–11. Pilzkundliche Arbeitsgemeinschaft in Westfalen 1968.
  (the concerning taxon: Lactarius deterrimus)
- Amanita submembranacea, ein leicht abgrenzbarer Scheidenstreifling. In: Boletus 3(2). 1979. pp. 26–29.
  (the concerning taxon: Amanita submembranacea)
- Phaeomarasmius pityroides (Brig. ss. Lge.) comb. nov., ein bemerkenswerter Schilfbewohner. In: Westfälische Pilzbriefe 10-11. Pilzkundliche Arbeitsgemeinschaft in Westfalen 1980. pp. 180–183.
  (the concerning taxon: Phaeomarasmius pityrodes)
- Was ist Hygrophorus leucophaeus Scop. ex Fr.? In: Zeitschrift für Mykologie 46(2). Deutsche Gesellschaft für Mykologie 1980. pp. 157–164.
  (the concerning taxa: Hygrophorus carpini, Hygrophorus unicolor)
- Hebeloma-Arten mit sacchariolens-Geruch. In: Zeitschrift für Mykologie 47. Deutsche Gesellschaft für Mykologie 1982. pp. 195–210.
  (the concerning taxon: Hebeloma fusisporum, Hebeloma gigaspermum, Hebeloma latifolium, Hebeloma tomentosum)
- Bestimmungsschlüssel für Blätterpilze. Teil 2. In: Mykologisches Mitteilungsblatt Halle 26. 1983. pp. 29–58.
  (the concerning taxon: Hygrocybe calcarum)
- Hebeloma herrmanniae Gröger spec. nov., Runzeliger Fälbling. In: Mykologisches Mitteilungsblatt Halle 28(1). 1985. pp. 5–8.
  (the concerning taxon: Hebeloma herrmanniae)
- Eine neue Psathyrella-Art aus der Sektion Cystopsathyra. In: Zeitschrift für Mykologie 52(1). Deutsche Gesellschaft für Mykologie 1986. pp. 133–138.
  (the concerning taxon: Psathyrella globosivelata)
- Wurzelnde Hebeloma-Arten. In: Zeitschrift für Mykologie 53. Deutsche Gesellschaft für Mykologie 1987. pp. 49–58.
  (the concerning taxon: Hebeloma danicum)
