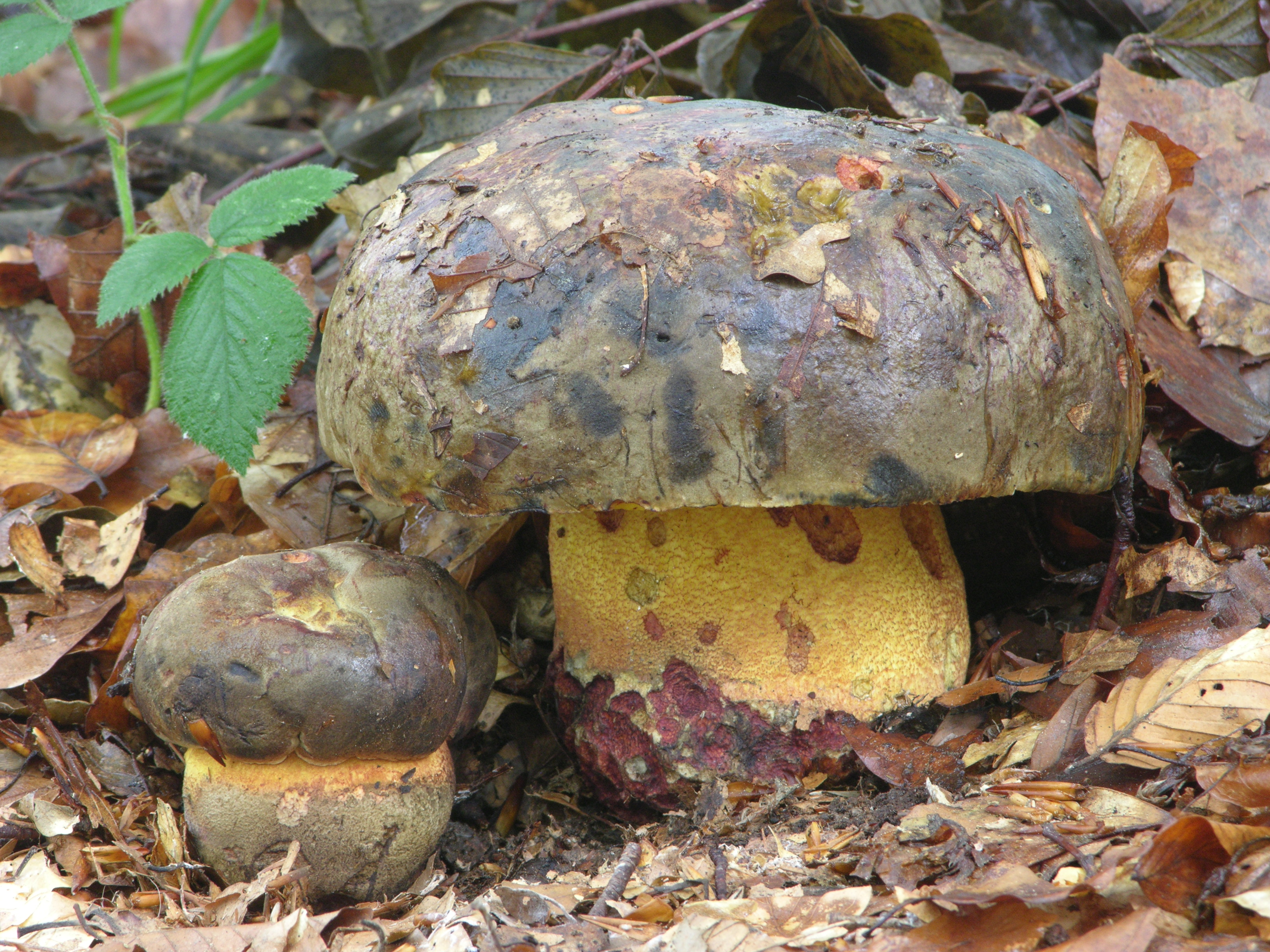

Scientific classification
- Kingdom: Fungi
- Division: Basidiomycota
- Class: Agaricomycetes
- Order: Boletales
- Family: Boletaceae
- Genus: Imperator
- Species: I. torosus

Binomial name
- Imperator torosus (Fr.) Assyov, Bellanger, Bertéa, Courtec., Koller, Loizides, G.Marques, J.A.Muñoz, N.Oppicelli, D.Puddu, F.Rich. & P.-A.Moreau (2015)

Synonyms
- Boletus torosus Fr. (1835); Dictyopus torosus (Fr.) Quél. (1886); Boletus purpureus var. xanthocyaneus Romagn. (1948); Boletus xanthocyaneus (Ramain) Romagn. (1976)

= Imperator torosus =

Species of fungus

Imperator torosus
- Mycological characteristics
- Pores on hymenium
- Cap is convex or flat
- Stipe is bare
- Spore print is olive-brown
- Ecology is mycorrhizal
- Edibility is poisonous

Imperator torosus, commonly known as the brawny bolete, is a species of bolete fungus in the family Boletaceae. It is native to southern Europe east to the Caucasus and Israel. It is generally associated with deciduous trees such as hornbeam, oak and beech in warm, dry locales. Although generally rare in Europe, it appears to be relatively common in Hungary. Appearing in summer and autumn on chalky soils, the stocky fruit bodies have an ochre cap up to 20 cm (8 in) across, yellow pores on the cap underside, and a wine-red to brown or blackish stipe up to 6–15 cm (2.4–5.9 in) long by 3–6 cm (1.2–2.4 in) wide. The pale yellow flesh changes to different colours when broken or bruised depending on age; younger mushrooms become reddish, and older ones additionally take on bluish tones.

Elias Magnus Fries and Christopher Theodor Hök first described this species as Boletus torosus in 1835, a name by which it came to be known for many years. Modern molecular phylogenetics shows that it is only distantly related to Boletus edulis—the type species of Boletus—and it was duly placed in the new genus Imperator in 2015. Eating raw mushrooms of this species leads to gastroenteritis. Illness has also occurred after eating cooked specimens, though this does not always happen.

== Taxonomy ==
Swiss mycologist Louis Secretan described the brawny bolete as Boletus pachypus in his 1833 work Mycographie Suisse. Many of his names have been rejected for nomenclatural purposes because Secretan had a narrow species concept, dividing many taxa into multiple species that were not supported by other authorities, and his works did not use binomial nomenclature consistently. Swedish mycologists Elias Magnus Fries and Christopher Theodor Hök described Boletus torosus in 1835 based on Secretan's B. pachypus—distinct from the B. pachypus described by Fries himself. (Note: Fries' Boletus pachypus is a synonym of Caloboletus radicans.) Fries reported in his 1838 book Epicrisis Systematis Mycologici seu Synopsis Hymenomycetum that he had not actually observed the species, and he did not designate a type specimen or illustration. (Note: Type specimens were not necessary for a valid species description at this time.) The specific epithet torosus, which derives from Latin, means "muscular". In the United Kingdom, it is known commonly as the "brawny bolete". The German name Ochsen-Röhrling means "oxen bolete" and the French bolet vigoureux is "strong bolete".

French naturalist Lucien Quélet transferred the species to the now-obsolete genus Dictyopus in 1886, which resulted in the synonym Dictyopus torosus. Boletus xanthocyaneus, first described by Henri Romagnesi in 1948 as Boletus purpureus var. xanthocyaneus and classified as a species in 1976, was considered by Italian mycologist Carlo Luciano Alessio to be synonymous with B. torosus. Others, however, regard this fungus a distinct species. In 2013, Italian mycologists Valerio Bertolini and Giampaolo Simonini observed that the brevity of the original species description meant that some subsequent papers used B. torosus for specimens that aligned more closely with descriptions of Boletus rhodopurpureus or B. luteocupreus (both now placed in the genus Imperator). They did note that Swiss and French authors had adhered to a more detailed description by Quélet, and that this was the only description faithful to the original description with a grey cap and yellow pores that slowly turn red. They concluded the original description must have been based on specimens growing near the French-Swiss border and hence selected a neotype specimen from this region.

Within the large genus Boletus, the brawny bolete was classified in the section Luridi, which included species producing medium to large fruit bodies with thick, swollen stipes, and minute pores. In 1996, Czech mycologist Jiří Hlaváček further subdivided the section Luridi, defining and naming the subsection Torosi—for B. torosus—to contain boletes that strongly bruised blue-black with handling.

In a molecular analysis of Boletaceae phylogeny, the brawny bolete was most closely related to Boletus luteocupreus; these two species formed a clade that was sister to B. luridus. Genetic analysis published in 2013 showed that B. torosus and many (but not all) red-pored boletes were part of a dupainii clade (named for B. dupainii), well-removed from the core group of Boletus edulis (the type species of genus Boletus) and relatives within the Boletineae. This indicated that the brawny bolete and its relatives needed to be placed in a new genus. It was made the type species of the new genus Imperator, (Note: Boletus luteocupreus and B. rhodopurpureus were also placed in this new genus.) becoming Imperator torosus, in 2015.

== Description ==
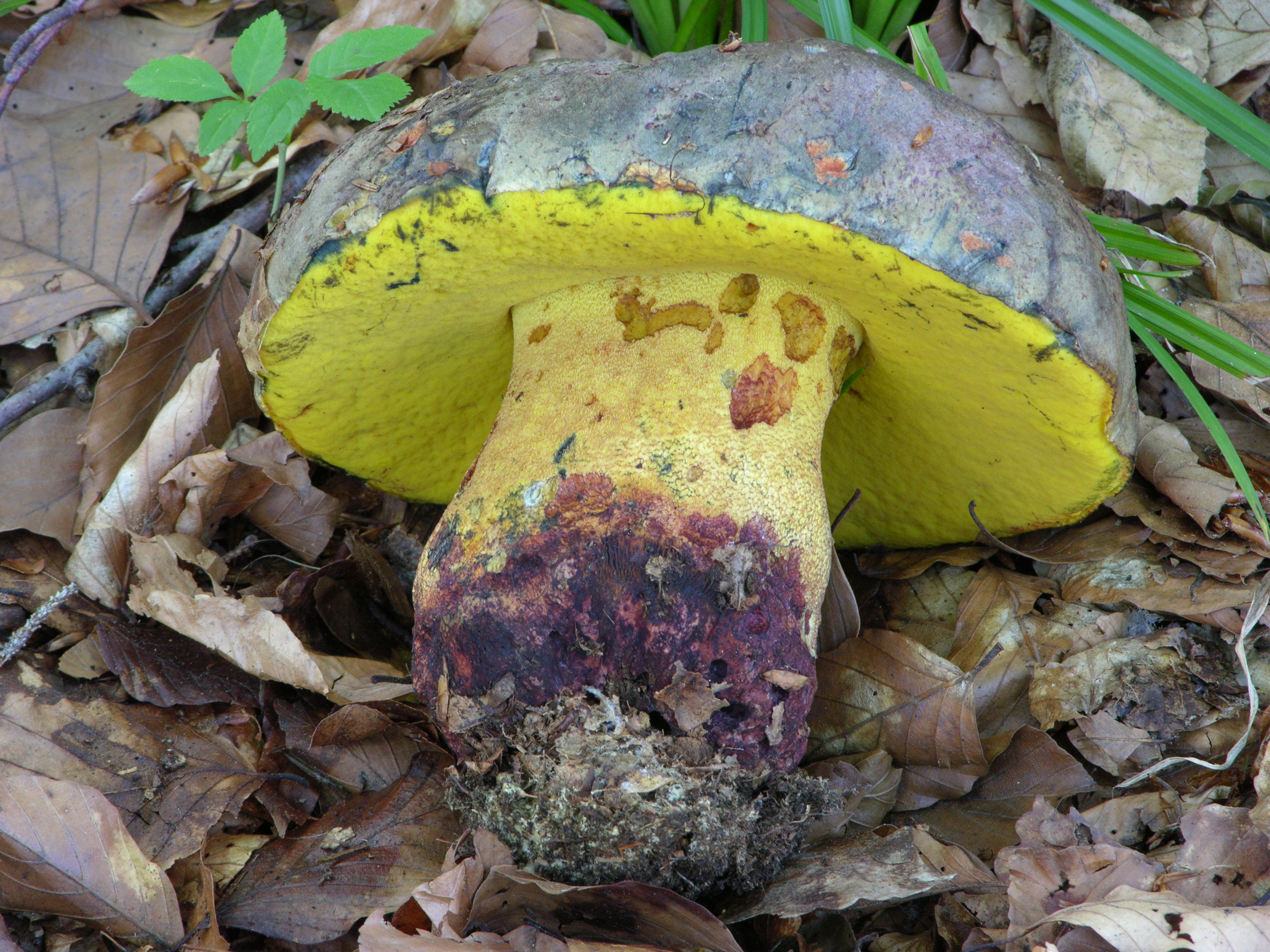
The base of the thick stipe is wine-red coloured.

Quite heavy compared with other mushrooms of similar size, the stocky fruit body contains relatively high amounts of chitin. Holding the brawny bolete has been described as "having a stone in your hand". The cap is 6–20 cm (2.4–7.9 in) in diameter. Hemispherical when young, it extends and flattens into a convex and finally a flattish shape, sometimes forming a slight depression in the centre. Initially curled downward and inward, the cap margin gradually turns outward, eventually flattening in maturity, and sometimes protruding beyond the pored undersurface. The surface texture starts slightly velvety, but becomes smoother and hairless with age; in moist weather, the cap is slightly sticky. Changing over time, the colour of the cap is initially vivid yellow or golden yellow, then ochre, then darkening in age to brown. However, if the cap cuticle is bruised, or even touched, there are sudden changes in the colour that depend on the age of the mushroom: young, yellow caps become cherry-red, while ochre-brown cap tissue bruises to reddish-purple. These colour changes soon give way to bluish or greyish tones, which, when combined, give the cap a variegated appearance.

The pores on the cap underside are round and small, the sulfur-yellow colour of the pore surface becoming less intense with age. The squat stipe measures 6–15 cm (2.4–5.9 in) long by 3–6 cm (1.2–2.4 in) thick. Egg-shaped when young, it lengthens somewhat as the mushroom grows, but is still bulbous in maturity; a mature stipe is typically a little shorter than the diameter of the cap. It is initially roughly the same colour as the cap, but as it matures, develops a wine-red colouration near the base and a dirty brown to bluish-black colouration elsewhere. The surface has a mesh-like pattern (reticulation) that has a colour development similar to that of the cap: initially yellow, then purplish, and finally dark brown. The flesh is thick and hard. It is yellow, except for the stipe base where it is deep red or dark brownish in older mushrooms. The pores, stipe and flesh turn greenish-blue with bruising or cutting. The smell is unpleasant, but the taste is mild.

The spore print is olive-brown. The smooth oval spores measure 12–15 by 5–6 μm, and sometimes have an internal oil drop. Basidia (spore-bearing cells) are club-shaped, four-spored, and measure 22–34 by 8–9 μm. The fusiform (fuse-shaped) cystidia are colourless with oil droplets, and have dimensions of 40–50 by 7–8 μm. Cap cuticle tissue is in the form of a trichoderm, where the outermost hyphae emerge roughly parallel, like hairs, perpendicular to the cap surface. These cylindrical, interwoven hyphae contain septa.

=== Similar species ===
The Mediterranean species Boletus poikilochromus somewhat resembles I. torosus, but can usually be distinguished by a smaller fruit body, a cylindrical stipe, and the lighter colours of younger mushrooms. Also, B. poikilochromus does not feature the colour change of the stipe base in mature fruit bodies that is seen in I. torosus. Imperator luteocupreus and Caloboletus radicans are also similar but the pores of the former are red, and the flesh of the latter has a bitter taste.

Several chemical tests can be used to distinguish I. torosus from other similar boletes, such as I. rhodopurpureus. I. torosus displays the following characteristic colour changes with tests performed on cut flesh less than 12 hours old: ammonium hydroxide (NH_{4}OH)–yellow centre bordered by a blue circular outer ring; potassium hydroxide (KOH)–deep buff (instantly); ferrous sulfate (FeS0_{4})–no change; Melzer's reagent–dark blue; phenol–blue green (very slow); formalin–mid blue (slow).

== Toxicity ==
Like many boletes, Imperator torosus causes gastrointestinal symptoms such as abdominal pain, diarrhoea, and vomiting when eaten raw. These reactions can also happen to some people when the mushroom is eaten cooked, though others have consumed it with no ill effects. In a 1994 study, researchers Ulrich Kiwitt and Hartmut Laatsch looked for the antabuse-like compound coprine in Suillellus luridus and similar species that had been suspected of inducing Antabuse-like reactions with alcohol. Coprine ingestion results in heat and flushing in the face, tingling in arms and legs, nausea and vomiting, and increased heart rate within five to ten minutes of consuming alcohol. They found none in the suspect species, but did find indications for it in Imperator torosus. They concluded that the most likely explanation for historical poisoning incidents was a misidentification of I. torosus with Suillellus luridus, though they could not rule out the latter species containing a hitherto unidentified compound causing alcohol-related reactions. No clinical cases of alcohol-related sensitivity have been recorded for I. torosus.

== Distribution and habitat ==
Imperator torosus is native to southern Europe east to the Caucasus and Israel. A mycorrhizal species, the fungus is generally associated with deciduous trees such as hornbeam (Carpinus), oak (Quercus) and beech (Fagus) in warm, dry locales, and is generally rare in Europe. Russian mycologist Anna Kiyashko has proposed it be listed on the IUCN Red List due to ongoing threats to its habitat. In the United Kingdom, it is listed as a "priority species"—a threatened species requiring conservation action under the UK Biodiversity Action Plan. Similarly, it is on the list of protected species of macrofungi in Montenegro, and Italy, where it has a highly restricted range and is considered threatened by changed forest fire intervals and habitat degradation. It appears to be relatively common in Hungary. It is found under Quercus coccifera trees in the Bar'am forest of Upper Galilee. Fruitings typically occur from July to September in calcareous (chalky) soil, with fruit bodies appearing either singly or in small groups.
