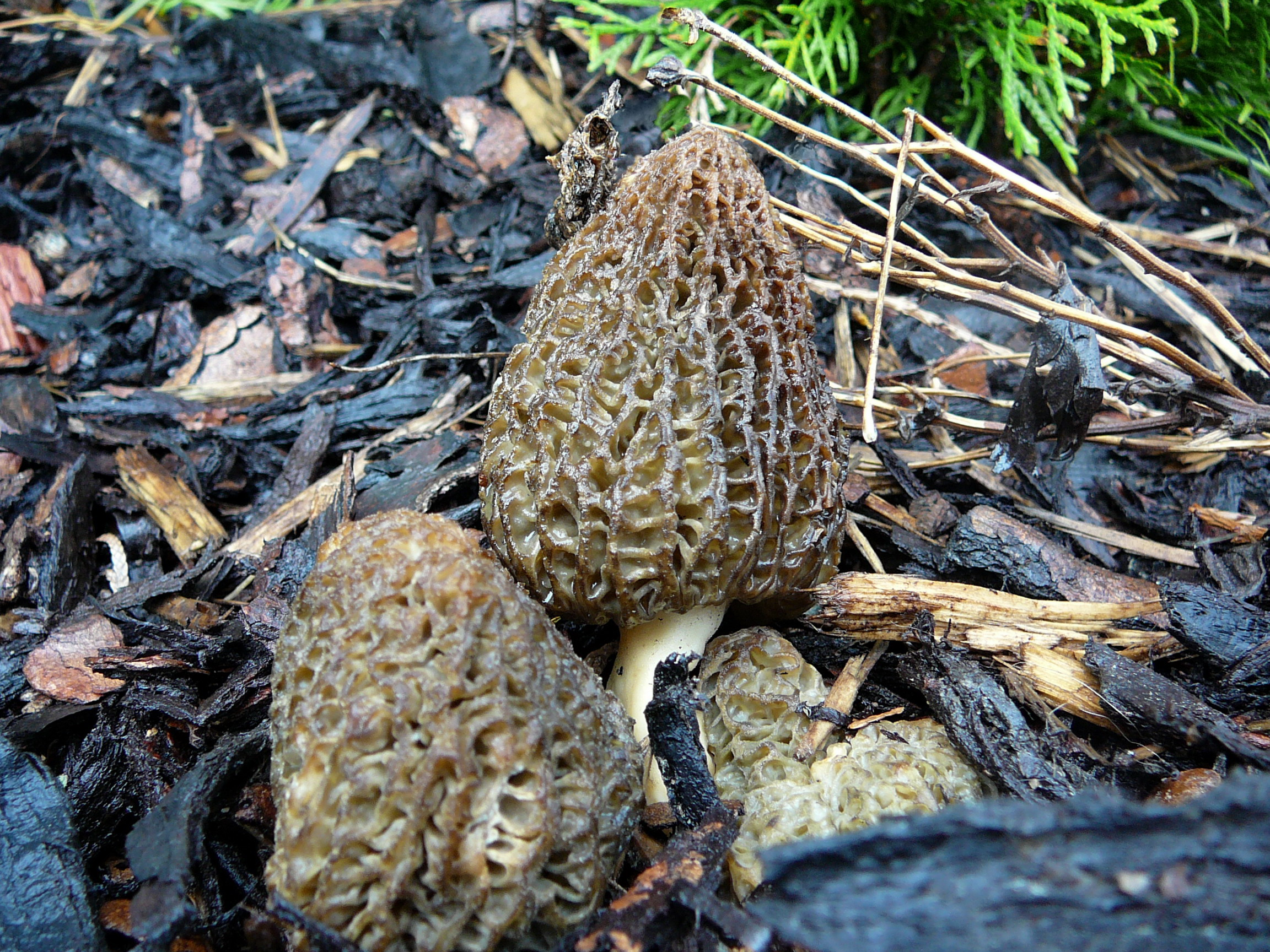

Scientific classification
- Domain: Eukaryota
- Kingdom: Fungi
- Division: Ascomycota
- Class: Pezizomycetes
- Order: Pezizales
- Family: Morchellaceae
- Genus: Morchella
- Species: M. pragensis

Binomial name
- Morchella pragensis Smotl. (1952)

Synonyms
- Morchella pterigoides Smotl. & M.Kolařík; Morchella pragensis f. mirabilis Smotl. (1952); Morchella pragensis f. turriformis Smotl. (1952); Morchella pragensis f. pterigoides (Smotl. & M.Kolařík) J.Veselský (1975)

= Morchella pragensis =

Species of fungus

Morchella pragensis, commonly known as the Prague morel, is a species of ascomycete fungus in the family Morchellaceae. Found in Europe, it was described as new to science in 1952 by Czech mycologist František Smotlacha.
