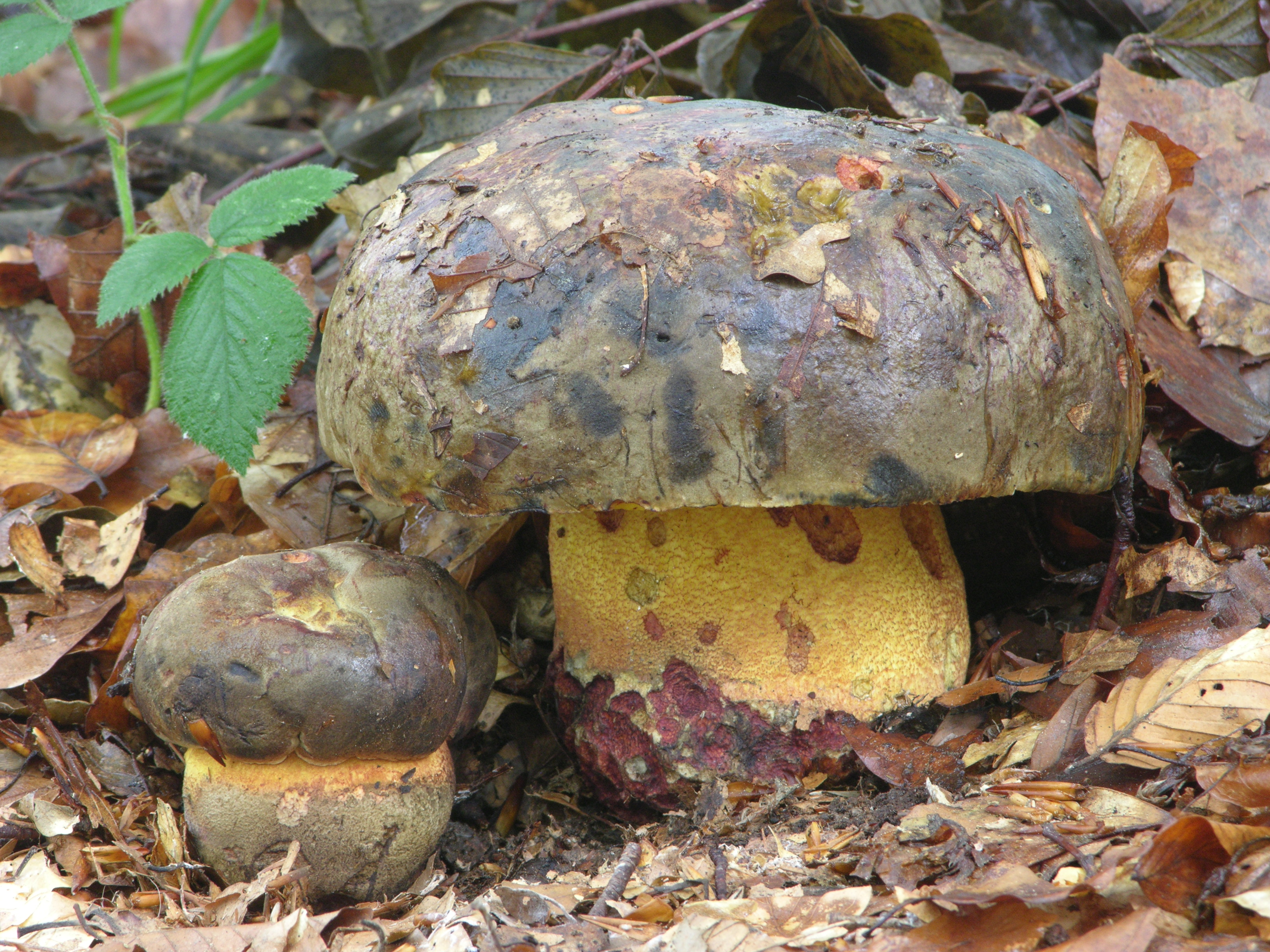
- Imperator torosus

Scientific classification
- Kingdom: Fungi
- Division: Basidiomycota
- Class: Agaricomycetes
- Order: Boletales
- Family: Boletaceae
- Genus: Imperator; Assyov, Bellanger, Bertéa, Courtec., Koller, Loizides, G.Marques, J.A.Muñoz, N.Oppicelli, D.Puddu, F.Rich. & P.-A.Moreau (2015)

Type species
- Imperator torosus (Fr.) Assyov, Bellanger, Bertéa, Courtec., Koller, Loizides, G.Marques, J.A.Muñoz, N.Oppicelli, D.Puddu, F.Rich. & P.-A.Moreau (2015)

= Imperator (fungus) =

Genus of fungi

Imperator is a genus of fungi in the family Boletaceae. It was circumscribed in 2015 by Boris Assyov and colleagues. The erection of Imperator follows recent molecular phylogenetic studies that outlined a new taxonomic framework for the Boletaceae.

The type species is Imperator torosus, an "impressive and prestigious" species to which the generic name Imperator refers.

All members of this genus are either toxic if consumed (causing gastroenteritis) or are of unknown edibility.

== Species ==
See table below:

Image	Scientific name	Taxon author	Year	Habitat	Distribution
	Imperator luteocupreus	(Bertéa & Estadès) Assyov, Bellanger, Bertéa, Courtec., Koller, Loizides, G.Marques, J.A.Muñoz, N.Oppicelli, D.Puddu, F.Rich. & P.-A.Moreau	2015 (1990)	chestnut (Castanea) and oak (Quercus)	southern Europe
	Imperator rhodopurpureus	(Smotl.) Assyov, Bellanger, Bertéa, Courtec., Koller, Loizides, G.Marques, J.A.Muñoz, N.Oppicelli, D.Puddu, F. Rich. & P.-A. Moreau	2015 (1952)	Deciduous trees including oak and beech in neutral soils.	Europe
	Imperator torosus	(Fr.) Assyov, Bellanger, Bertéa, Courtec., Koller, Loizides, G.Marques, J.A.Muñoz, N.Oppicelli, D.Puddu, F.Rich. & P.-A.Moreau	2015 (1835)	Deciduous trees such as hornbeam (Carpinus), oak (Quercus) and beech (Fagus)	Europe
	Imperator xanthocyaneus	(Ramain) Klofac	2018 (1948)		Western Europe
