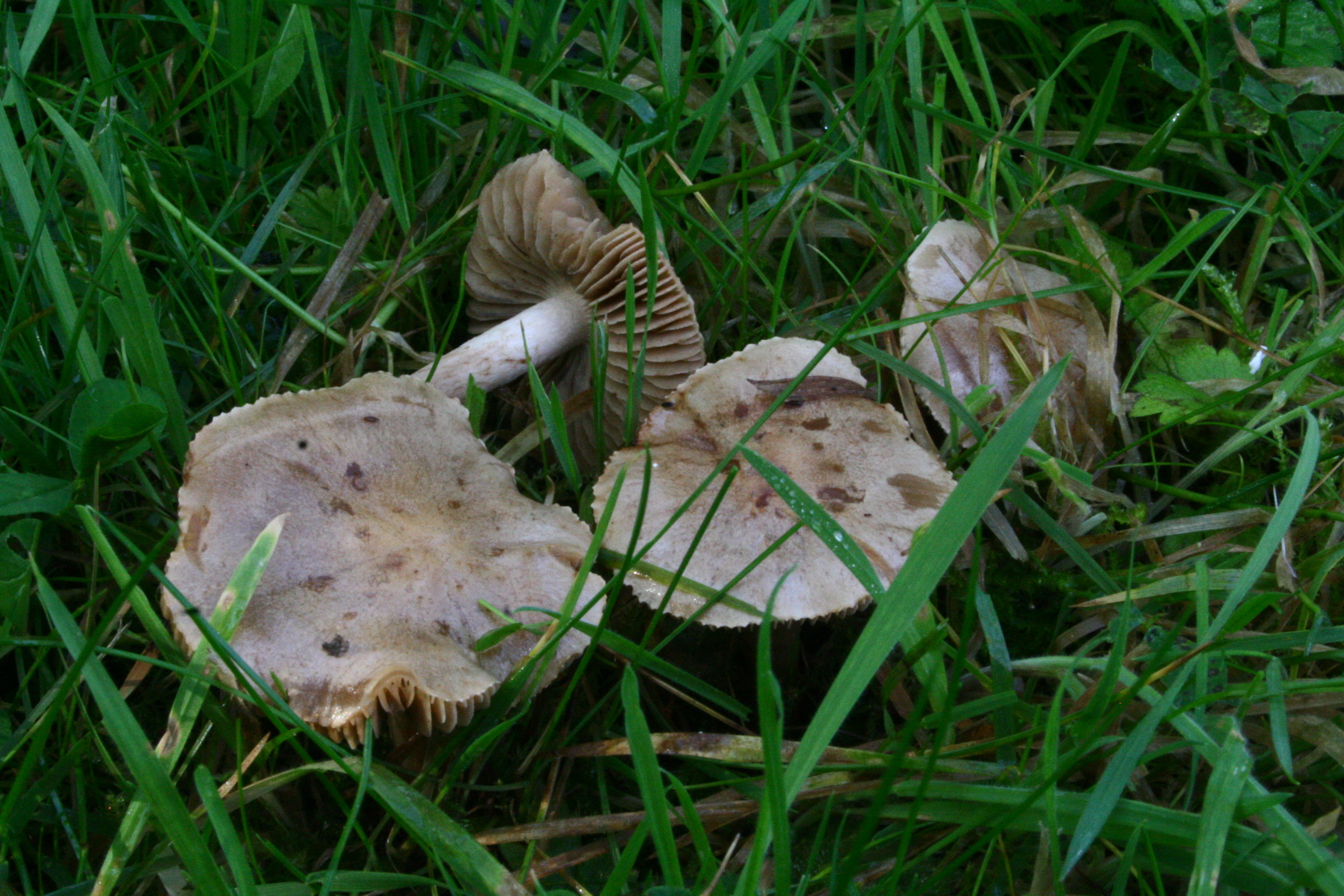

Scientific classification
- Domain: Eukaryota
- Kingdom: Fungi
- Division: Basidiomycota
- Class: Agaricomycetes
- Order: Agaricales
- Family: Hymenogastraceae
- Genus: Hebeloma
- Species: H. gigaspermum

Binomial name
- Hebeloma gigaspermum Gröger & Zschiesch.

= Hebeloma gigaspermum =

Species of fungus

Hebeloma gigaspermum Mycological characteristics
- Gills on hymenium
- Cap is convex
- Hymenium is emarginate
- Stipe is bare
- Spore print is brown
- Ecology is mycorrhizal
- Edibility is unknown

Hebeloma gigaspermum is a European species of mushroom in the family Hymenogastraceae.

== Taxonomy ==
The species Hebeloma gigaspermum was first described only in 1981 and is very similar to the more well known Hebeloma sacchariolens (being placed in subsection Sacchariolentia of the genus). It is not uncommon in Northern Europe and until 1981 examples were probably simply considered to be H. sacchariolens.

The name gigaspermum means "giant-spored".

== Description ==
It is an undistinguished clay brown or ochre mushroom with somewhat viscid cap, up to about 5 centimetres (2 inches) in diameter, and has a strong sweet odour which has been likened to orange blossom or amyl acetate.

== Similar species ==
It is similar to H. sacchariolens, and according to one source can be distinguished by

- its ecology with willow and alder in boggy ground (as opposed to forests and gardens with broad-leaved trees in general), and
- its large spore size of 13–17 × 7–9 μm (as opposed to 11–14 × 6–8 μm).

As Hebeloma contains poisonous species, H. sacchariolens is not to be recommended for culinary use.
