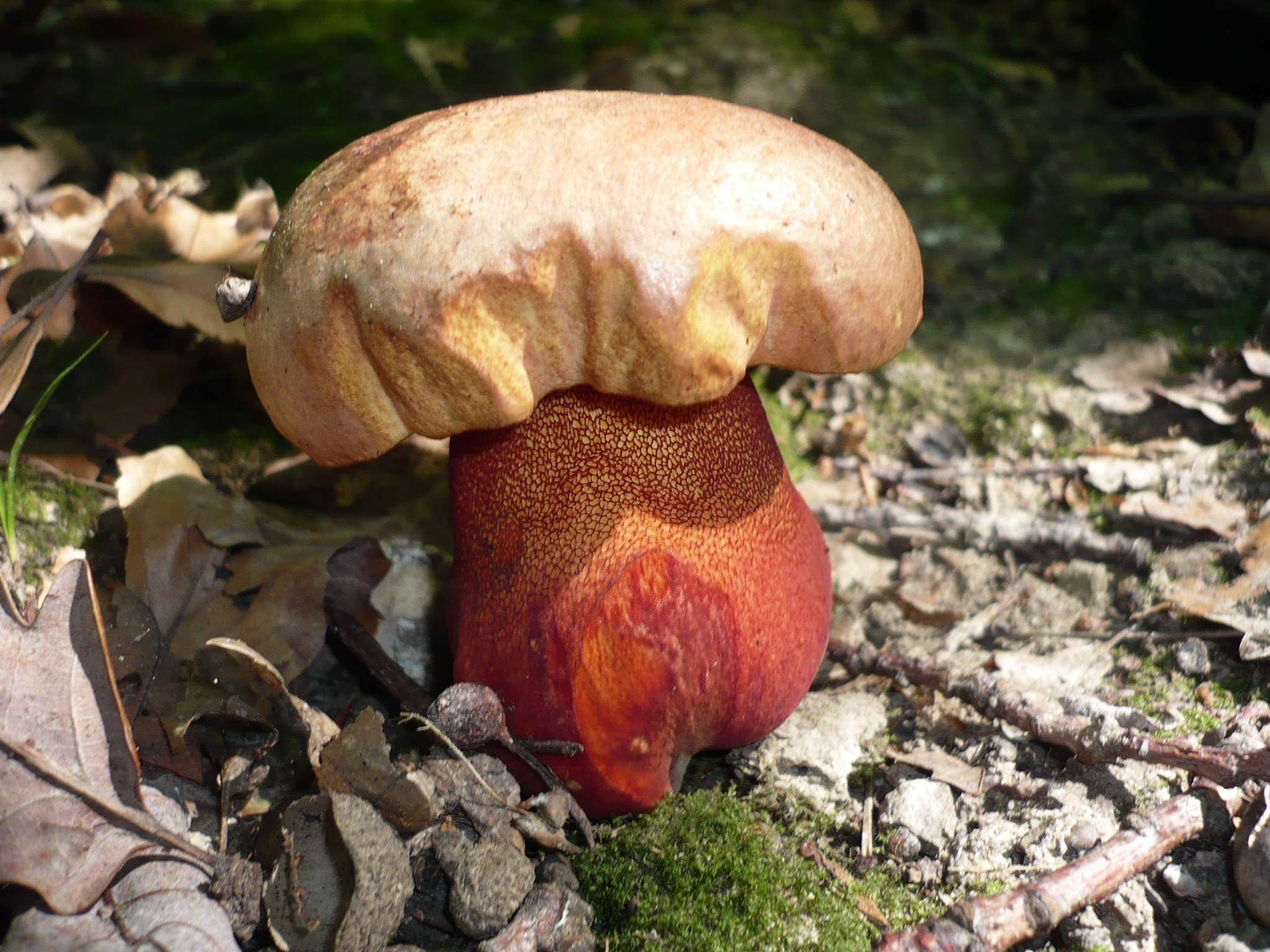

Scientific classification
- Kingdom: Fungi
- Division: Basidiomycota
- Class: Agaricomycetes
- Order: Boletales
- Family: Boletaceae
- Genus: Imperator
- Species: I. luteocupreus

Binomial name
- Imperator luteocupreus (Bertèa & Estadés) Assyov, Bellanger, Bertéa, Courtec., Koller, Loizides, G. Marques, J.A. Muñoz, N. Oppicelli, D. Puddu, F. Rich. & P.-A. Moreau (2015)

Synonyms
- Boletus luteocupreus Bertèa & Estadés

= Imperator luteocupreus =

Species of fungus

Imperator luteocupreus
- Mycological characteristics
- Pores on hymenium
- Cap is convex
- Hymenium is adnate
- Stipe is bare
- Ecology is mycorrhizal
- Edibility is unknown

Imperator luteocupreus is a species of bolete fungus in the family Boletaceae. It is native to southern Europe, where it is found under chestnut (Castanea) and oak (Quercus). Although it was originally described in genus Boletus, it was placed in the new genus Imperator in 2015, based on phylogenetic inferences.

== Taxonomy ==
Mycologists Paul Bertéa and Alain Estadès described this species as Boletus luteocupreus in 1990. The type specimen had been collected by Estadès in 1986 from the Lachau commune in the Drôme department of southeastern France. In a molecular analysis of Boletaceae phylogeny, Boletus luteocupreus was most closely related to B. torosus; these two species formed a clade that was sister to B. luridus. Genetic analysis published in 2013 showed that B. luteocupreus and many (but not all) red-pored boletes were part of a dupainii clade (named for B. dupainii), well-removed from the core group of Boletus edulis (the type species of genus Boletus) and relatives within the Boletineae. This indicated that B. luteocupreus and its relatives needed to be placed in a new genus. It was placed in the new genus Imperator, becoming Imperator luteocupreus, in 2015.

== Description ==
The yellowish cap is up to 12 cm (4.7 in) in diameter and marked with orange spots. Hemispherical when young, it extends and flattens into a convex shape. The surface texture starts slightly velvety, becoming smoother with age. The pores on the cap underside are red, while the bulbous stipe yellow overlain with a prominent red net-like pattern, and measures up to 9 cm (3.5 in) high by 5 cm (2.0 in) thick. The flesh is thick and hard. It is yellow, except for the stipe base where it is deep red. It has an acidic taste. The smell is indistinct. All parts of the mushroom stain a deep blue when cut or bruised.

=== Similar species ===
It resembles Imperator torosus but can be distinguished by its red (rather than yellow) pores.

== Distribution and habitat ==
Imperator luteocupreus occurs in the Canary Islands, Menorca, Cyprus, Serbia, North Macedonia, Moldova, Sicily, Corsica, France, Germany, Italy, Spain, and Bulgaria, where it is rare. It may also be present in Greece and Switzerland. It grows under oak (Quercus). It grows under sweet chestnut (Castanea sativa) in Bulgaria.

== See also ==
- List of Boletus species
