= František Smotlacha =

Czech mycologist

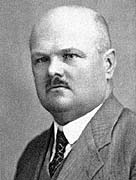
František Smotlacha before 1937

František Smotlacha (30 January 1884 in Hradec Králové – 18 June 1956 in Prague) was a Czech mycologist. He founded the Czechoslovak Mycological Society in 1921 together with Rudolf Veselý and the leading journal of Czech mycology: Mykologický sborník - Časopis Českých Houbařů (known as the C.C.H. among mycologists) in 1919. He was also president of the Czechoslovak Jiujitsu Union and founder of collegiate sport in Czechoslovakia. His son, Miroslav Smotlacha, also became a mycologist.

Smotlacha described many species of fungi including

- Boletus rhodopurpureus
- Morchella pragensis
- Boletus fuscoroseus

He also wrote many books about fungi, both scientific and popular: his greatest success was Atlas hub jedlých a nejedlých; mycologia practica (14 editions 1947–1952) that described 78 "edible and non edible" mushrooms (with color photos).
