= Miroslav Smotlacha =

Czech mycologist (1920–2007)

- Born: 22 September 1920; Královské Vinohrady, Czechoslovakia
- Died: 6 June 2007 (aged 86); Prague, Czech Republic
- Education: Institute of Chemical Technology in Prague
- Scientific career
- Fields: Mycology

Miroslav Smotlacha (22 September 1920 – 6 June 2007) was a Czech mycologist.

== Life ==
Smotlacha was born on 22 September 1920 in Královské Vinohrady (now Vinohrady, a district of Prague) and attended the Institute of Chemical Technology in Prague.

== Mycology ==
Smotlacha was interested in fungi since childhood. From the age of fourteen he worked at the magazine Mykologický sborník ("Mycological collection"). In 1956, after the death of his father, František Smotlacha, he was elected director of the Czechoslovak Mycological Society (since 1990 Czech Mycological Society), where he was active until his death.

Smotlacha dealt with practical mycology, particularly culinary technology and industrial processing of mushrooms and mushroom food products. He was the author or co-author of a number of popular mushroom atlases and cookbooks. He significantly contributed to knowledge of edible and poisonous mushrooms, and was engaged in the protection of mushrooms, forests and nature in general. After the death of Dr Jiri Hlavacek, he was the managing editor of Mykologický sborník (2001–2006). He worked in the field of wood-destroying fungi and other pests. He worked in the laboratory of wood fungi in the Czechoslovak Mycological Society, and contributed to the rescue and repair of many Czech monuments.

In 2005, Smotlacha was awarded the Medal of Merit (Second Class) for lifetime achievements. In 2006 he was elected honorary chairman of the Czech Mycological Society.
