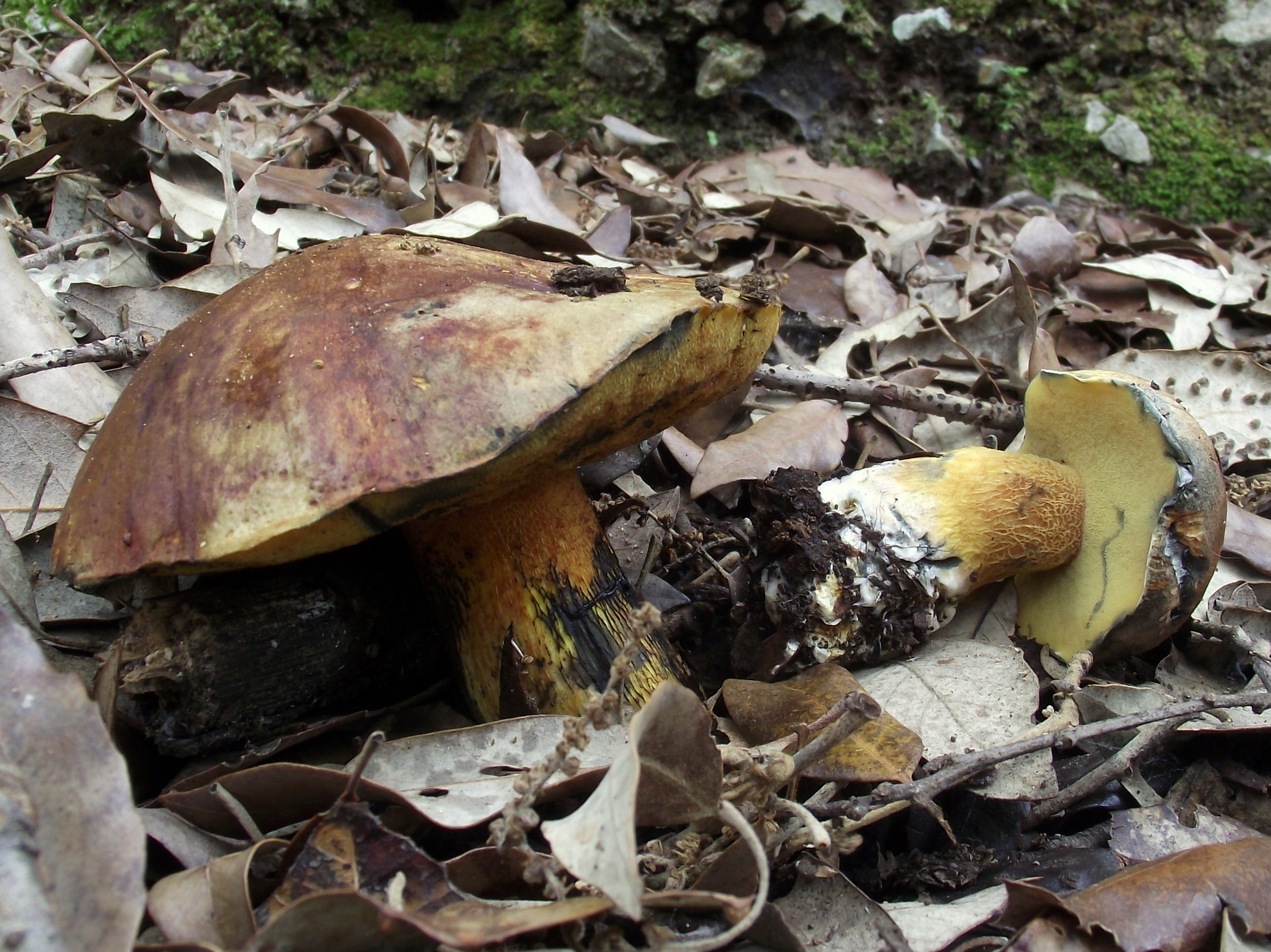

Scientific classification
- Domain: Eukaryota
- Kingdom: Fungi
- Division: Basidiomycota
- Class: Agaricomycetes
- Order: Boletales
- Family: Boletaceae
- Genus: Boletus
- Species: B. poikilochromus

Binomial name
- Boletus poikilochromus Pöder, Cetto & Zuccher.

= Boletus poikilochromus =

Species of fungus

Boletus poikilochromus is a species of bolete native to southern (Mediterranean) Europe and Israel.
