= Hebeloma fusisporum =

Scientific classification
- Kingdom: Fungi
- Division: Basidiomycota
- Class: Agaricomycetes
- Order: Agaricales
- Family: Hymenogastraceae
- Genus: Hebeloma
- Species: H. fusisporum

Binomial name
- Hebeloma fusisporum Gröger & Zschiesch.

Species of fungus

Hebeloma fusisporum is a species of mushroom in the family Hymenogastraceae.
