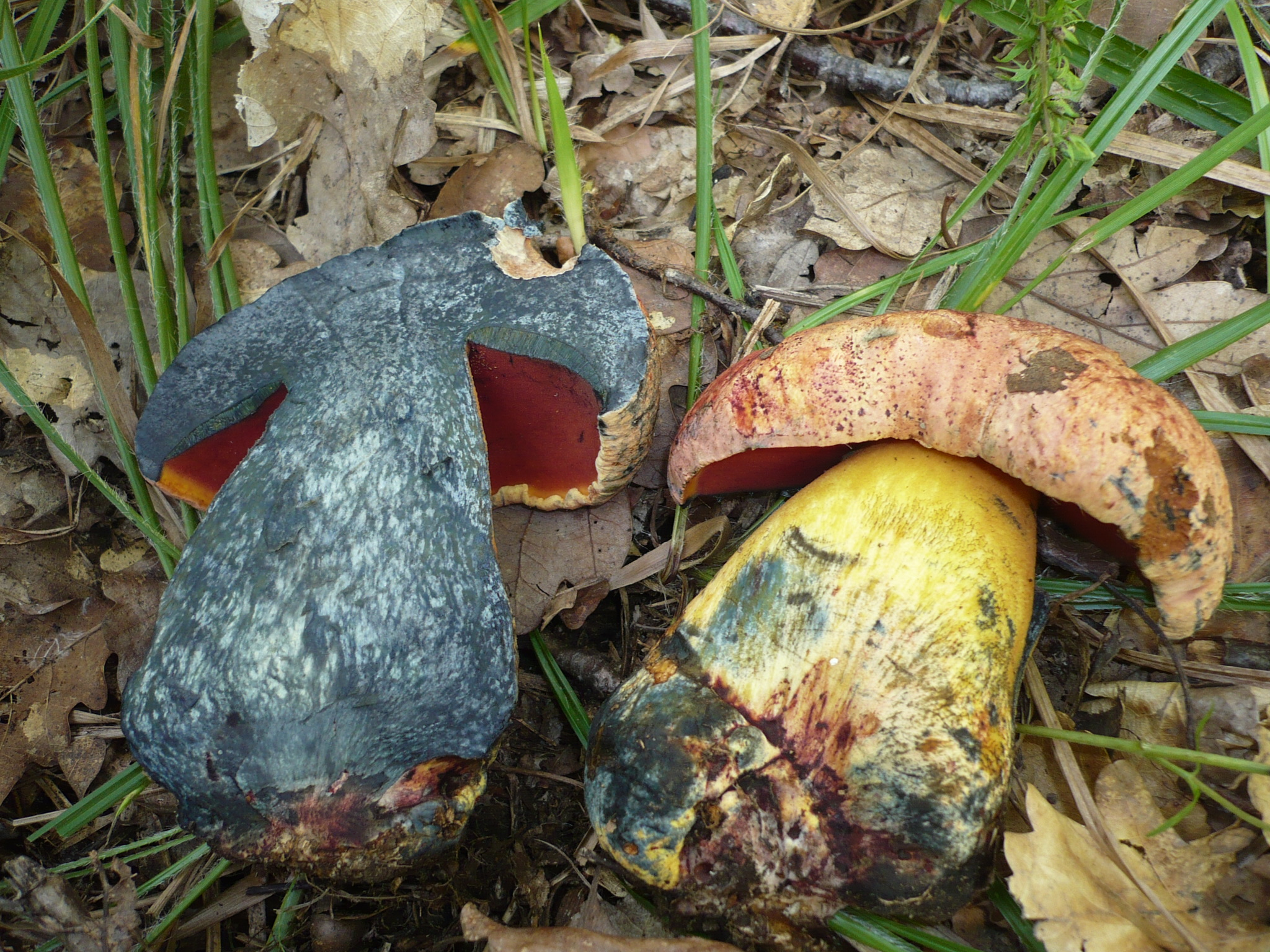

Scientific classification
- Kingdom: Fungi
- Division: Basidiomycota
- Class: Agaricomycetes
- Order: Boletales
- Family: Boletaceae
- Genus: Imperator
- Species: I. rhodopurpureus

Binomial name
- Imperator rhodopurpureus (Smotl.) Assyov, Bellanger, Bertéa, Courtec., Koller, Loizides, G. Marques, J.A.Muñoz, N.Oppicelli, D.Puddu, F.Rich. & P.-A. Moreau (2015)

Synonyms
- Boletus rhodopurpureus Smotl. (1952); Suillellus rhodopurpureus (Smotl.) Blanco-Dios (2015)

= Imperator rhodopurpureus =

Species of fungus

Imperator rhodopurpureus
- Mycological characteristics
- Pores on hymenium
- Cap is convex
- Hymenium is adnate
- Stipe is bare
- Ecology is mycorrhizal
- Edibility is unknown

The oldrose bolete, Imperator rhodopurpureus, is an inedible fungus of the genus Imperator, found under deciduous trees including oak and beech in neutral soils. Initially described as Boletus rhodopurpureus, it was transferred to the new genus Imperator in 2015. The bolete is considered critically endangered in the Czech Republic and endangered in the United Kingdom, reported most commonly from Berkshire and Hampshire, and typically very rare throughout, although up to a hundred fruiting bodies have been recorded at a few sites.

== Description ==
The cap is cushion-like, up to 15 cm in diameter; faint yellow- or pink-buff when young, later flushing red from the rim and becoming blotched with yellow, red and olivaceous tones. The tubes are orange or red at first, then turning dark blue when cut. The spores are olive-brown. The stem is rather short, and sometimes very bulbous. The flesh is pale yellow, rapidly turning deep blue when cut. Bruises deep blue when handled, bruising blue at the slightest touch. A very rare bolete which has a predominantly yellow colouration has also been reported regularly fruiting along with normal-coloured oldrose boletes, such as from Windsor Great Park in the UK. It had previously been identified as Boletus xanthocyaneus prior to DNA studies, which found it to represent a rare colour morph of I. rhodopurpureus. It is possible that B. xanthocyaneus is synonymous with I. rhodopurpureus.

== Occurrence in the UK ==
The oldrose bolete is very rare in the UK, typically favouring old open woodland or parkland with plenty of sunlight on neutral soils, reported mainly from the south of England such as parts of the New Forest and Windsor Great Park.

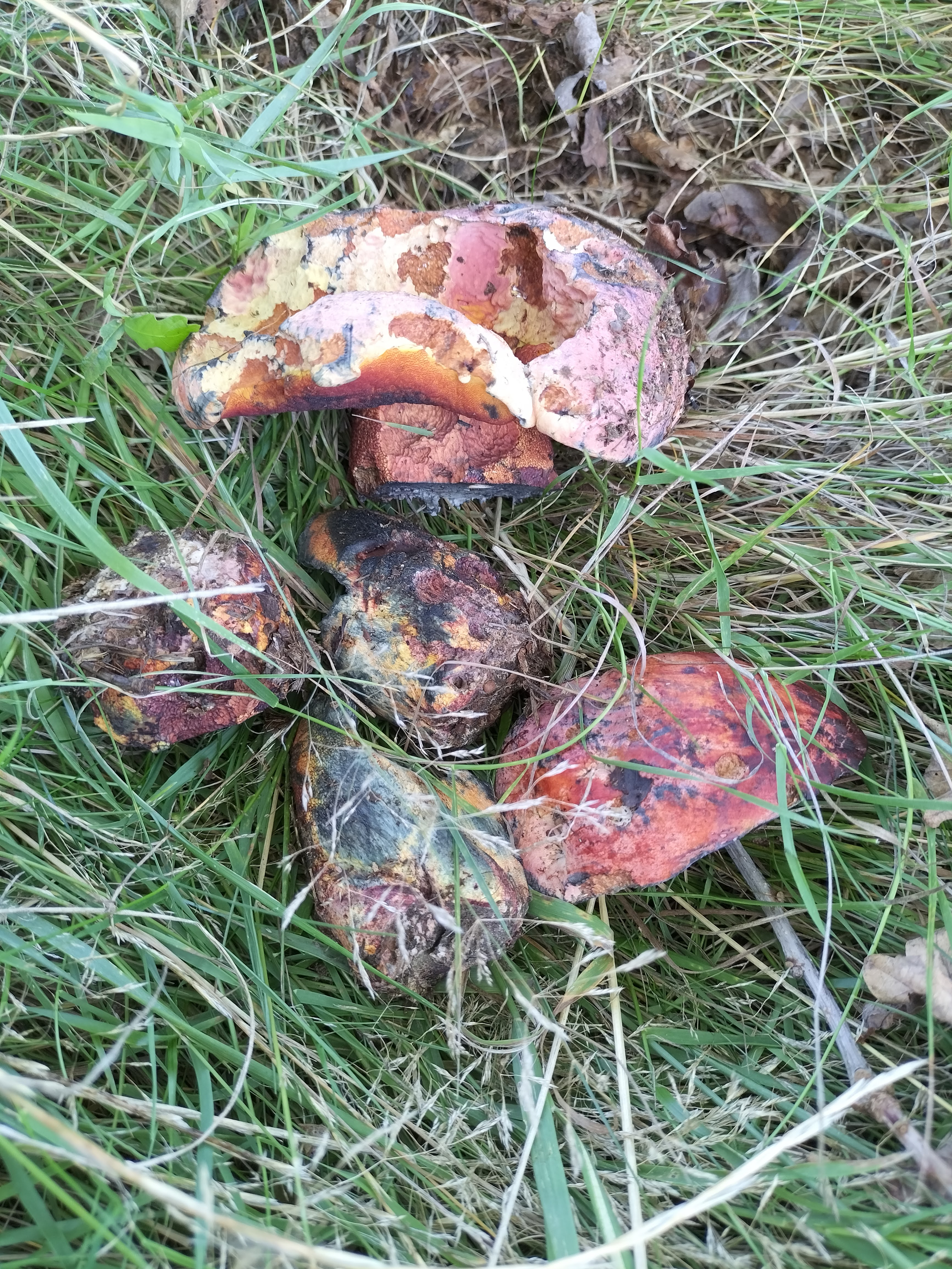
Oldrose bolete at Windsor Great Park

== Similar species and edibility ==
In the warmest regions of central and southern Europe the blood red-capped Rubroboletus dupainii. It has also been regularly confused with the poisonous bilious bolete, Rubroboletus legaliae, from which it is distinguished by a much stronger bluing response when cut and handled. Commonly, the bilious bolete smells of hay or chicory, whereas the oldrose bolete has more acidic tones in its smell. Oldrose bolete is poisonous when raw and is generally considered poisonous even when cooked. The combination of being extremely uncommon and a confusion risk with the even more poisonous Rubroboletus genus makes this species one to avoid collecting for food.
