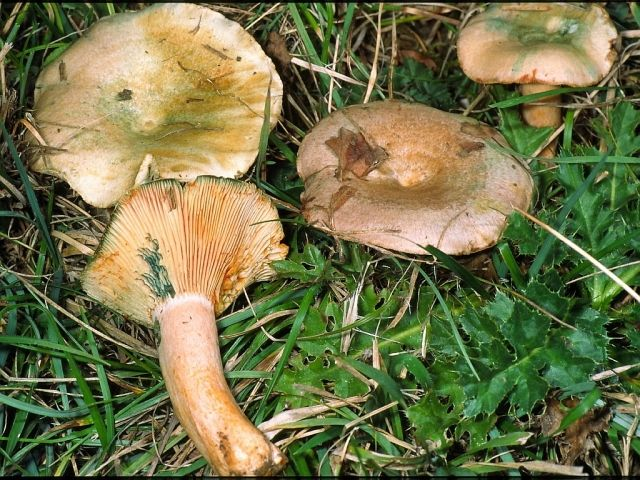

Scientific classification
- Domain: Eukaryota
- Kingdom: Fungi
- Division: Basidiomycota
- Class: Agaricomycetes
- Order: Russulales
- Family: Russulaceae
- Genus: Lactarius
- Species: L. semisanguifluus

Binomial name
- Lactarius semisanguifluus R.Heim & Leclair (1950)

= Lactarius semisanguifluus =

Species of fungus

Lactarius semisanguifluus Mycological characteristics
- Gills on hymenium
- Cap is depressed
- Hymenium is decurrent
- Stipe is bare
- Spore print is tan
- Ecology is mycorrhizal
- Edibility is choice

Lactarius semisanguifluus is a species of fungus in the family Russulaceae.

== See also ==
- List of Lactarius species
