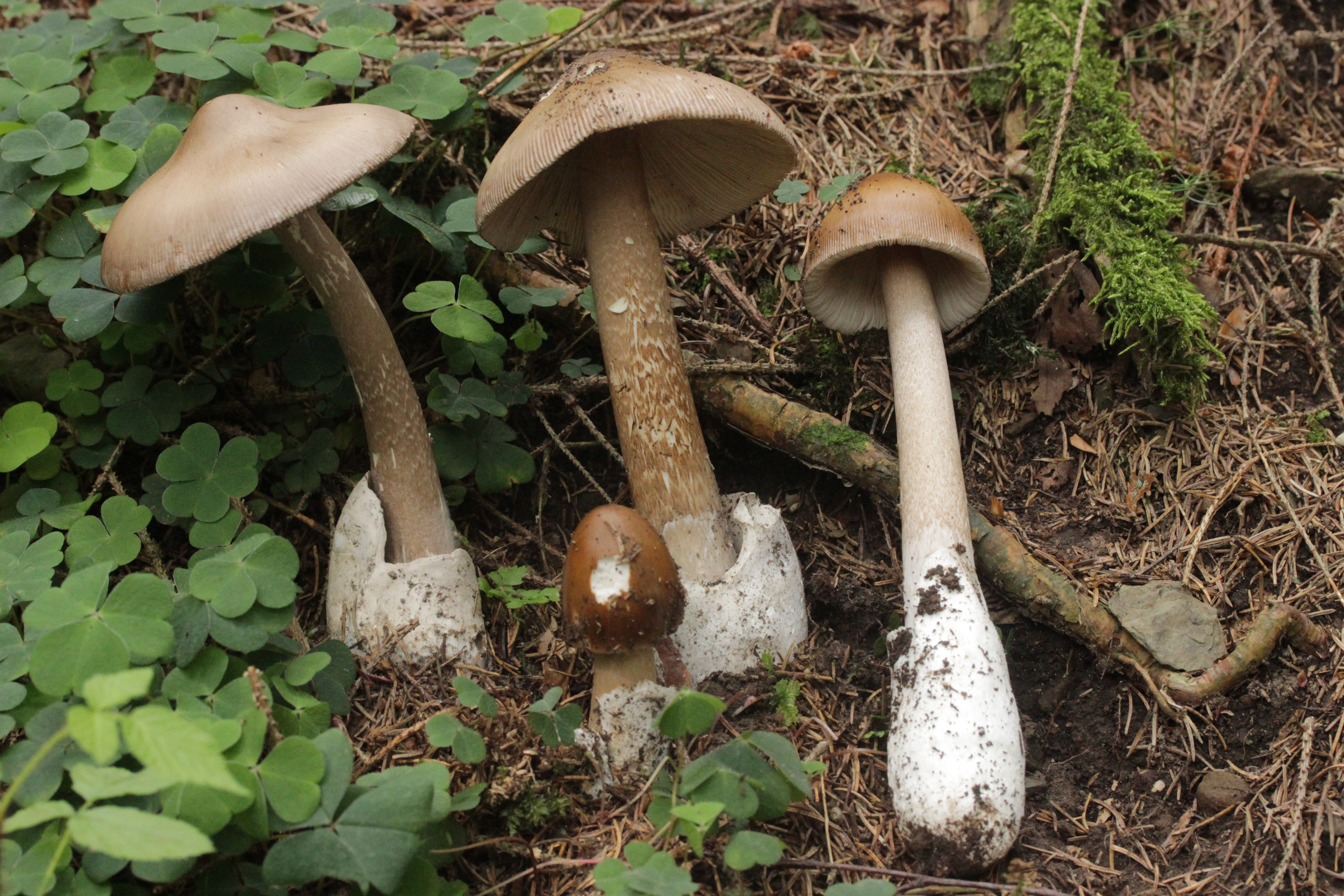

Scientific classification
- Kingdom: Fungi
- Division: Basidiomycota
- Class: Agaricomycetes
- Order: Agaricales
- Family: Amanitaceae
- Genus: Amanita
- Species: A. submembranacea

Binomial name
- Amanita submembranacea (Bon) Gröger, 1979

= Amanita submembranacea =

Species of fungus

Amanita submembranacea is a species of fungus belonging to the family Amanitaceae.

It is native to Europe and Northern America.
