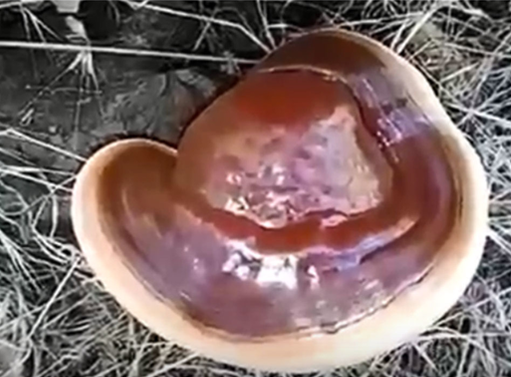
- Ganoderma growing under oak in California

Scientific classification
- Kingdom: Fungi
- Division: Basidiomycota
- Class: Agaricomycetes
- Order: Polyporales
- Family: Ganodermataceae
- Genus: Ganoderma
- Species: G. lucidum

Binomial name
- Ganoderma lucidum Karst (1881)

Synonyms
- Boletus lucidus (Curtis) Polyporus lucidus (Murrill)

= Ganoderma lucidum =

Species of fungus

Ganoderma lucidum
- Mycological characteristics
- Pores on hymenium
- No distinct cap or offset
- Hymenium attachment is irregular or not applicable
- Stipe is bare or lacks a stipe
- Spore print is brown
- Ecology is parasitic
- Edibility is too hard to eat

Ganoderma lucidum, commonly known as reishi, varnished conk, lacquered bracket, or lingzhi, is a red-colored species of Ganoderma with a limited distribution in Europe and parts of China, where it grows on decaying hardwood trees.

== Taxonomy ==
The history of the Ganoderma lucidum taxon is tied to the history of Ganoderma as a genus. Karsten first described the Ganoderma in 1881 and included only one species in the genus, G. lucidum (Curtis) Karst. Previously, it was called Boletus lucidus Curtis (1781) and then Polyporus lucidus (Curtis) Fr. (1821). Patouillard revised Karsten's genus Ganoderma to include all species with pigmented spores, adhering tubes and laccate-crusted cuticles, which resulted in a total of 48 species classified under the genus Ganoderma in his 1889 monograph.

Despite this recognition of additional species and subsequent discoveries of new Ganoderma species, such as 17 new North American species identified by Murrill North in 1902, the taxonomy of Ganoderma species has remained chaotic, and the species name Ganoderma lucidum continues to be used for most Ganoderma species, including commonly misidentifying Ganoderma sichuanense (= Ganoderma lingzhi) (also known as reishi mushroom (Japan) or lingzhi/ling chih (China)), the sought-after red Ganoderma species used in traditional Asian medicine. G. lucidum is not a synonym for G. sichuanense (nor G. lingzhi) and is not in the same clade; based on molecular phylogenetic analyses, G. lucidum is more closely related to North American species G. tsugae and G. oregonense than to G. sichuanense, whose sister taxa include G. curtisii and G. ravenelii.

These genetic analyses tested species concept hypotheses to determine how the Ganoderma taxa are related. One such study found six major clades among the 29 samples studied. Samples labeled as G. lucidum were found in five of the six clades, showing the extent of the confusion around species identification. Another study found similar results and also showed that G. resinaceum from Europe and the North American sample wrongly labeled G. lucidum were sister taxa and were also more closely related to each other than the European G. lucidum.

A 2015 phylogenic study revealed that the global diversity of the Ganoderma species included three supported major lineages. These results agree with several of the earlier works focusing mostly on morphology, geography and host preference, but with evidence separating the European and North American taxa..

=== Etymology ===
The scientific name, Ganoderma lucidum, uses the genus name, Ganoderma (derived from Greek ganos/γάνος 'brightness, sheen', hence 'shining' and derma/δέρμα 'skin') combined with lucidum from Latin lucidus 'light, bright, clear'.

== Description ==
Reishi is a purple-brown mushroom with a long stalk, brown spores, and a fan-shaped cap with a shiny appearance, and may have six colors. It grows on decaying tree stumps mainly of plum or oak. Native to China, Japan, and North America, it is commonly cultivated throughout Asia.

The caps can grow up to 35 centimetres (14 in) across. The fruiting body almost always has a stipe present, which is tawny to russet colored and 1.5 times the diameter of the cap. Context tissue (sterile tissue inside the fruiting body between the pileus crust and the initiation of the tubes) is pink-buff to cinnamon-buff and corky, showing concentric growth zones and no resinous or melanoid deposits. The hymenium displays 4–5 pores per millimetre. Chlamydospores are absent. Basidiospores are 8.2–12.1 μm (average 10.7 μm) long and 4.8–8.9 μm (average 7.1 μm) wide, with a spore shape index of 66.2.

=== Phytochemicals ===
G. lucidum phytochemicals include diverse polysaccharides, triterpenes, ganoderic acid, alkaloids, flavonoids, and saponins.

== Distribution and ecology ==
The species is widely distributed in tropical and subtropical rainforest regions in Asia, Africa, and the United States. It has been used for food and traditional medicine over centuries in China, Vietnam, and India.

It is cultivated using intensive cultivation technology in Japan, Korea, and China, and is cultivated in some South American countries. In the southern region of Vietnam, it can be seen growing on dầu lim trees on Phú Quốc.

Wild populations found in the U.S. states of California and Utah were likely introduced anthropogenically and naturalized.

This species is the favored food of the large North American pleasing fungus beetle Megalodacne fasciata.

== Cultivation ==
A 2020 study indicated ways to cultivate it in different types of side-streams and waste, but this species does not usually produce fruiting bodies as well as in other woods, such as aspen, probably because softwoods contain compounds which are toxic to several fungi, including Ganoderma spp. However, recent studies found that G. lucidum is still able to degrade Pinus sylvestris wood, causing a wood delignification but keeping proportion of carbohydrates high, opening new doors to softwoods in their utilization in G. lucidum cultivation.

== Uses ==
The species is inedible and rock-hard when dried, but is used to make a bitter-tasting tea. Due to the poor quality of clinical research, there is no good evidence for the use of G. lucidum in treating cardiovascular diseases in people with type 2 diabetes or any other medical condition.

It has safety concerns and moderate interactions with certain medications and dietary supplements.

=== Products ===
The confusion surrounding the taxonomy of Ganoderma species has persisted, causing confusion and inaccuracies when labeling folklore products containing Ganoderma species, as well as "grow your own" (GYO) kits and other tissue samples sold for cultivation of Ganoderma species. Products typically carry a label of G. lucidum, using the words "reishi" and "lingzhi/ling chih" (which most typically refer to Asian Ganoderma species used in traditional medicine, such as G. sichuanense and Ganoderma sinense) merely because they contain a laccate Ganoderma species.

These products and GYO kits sold as Ganoderma lucidum may not contain G. lucidum: one study showed through DNA analysis that 93% of GYO kits and half of the dried mushroom products studied that were labeled "G. lucidum" contained G. sichuanense in actuality, an inaccurate labeling. The study also found that no manufactured reishi product and only one GYO kit actually contained G. lucidum. Other species present in these products included Ganoderma applanatum, Ganoderma australe (potentially a species complex), Ganoderma gibbosum, Ganoderma sessile, and G. sinense.
