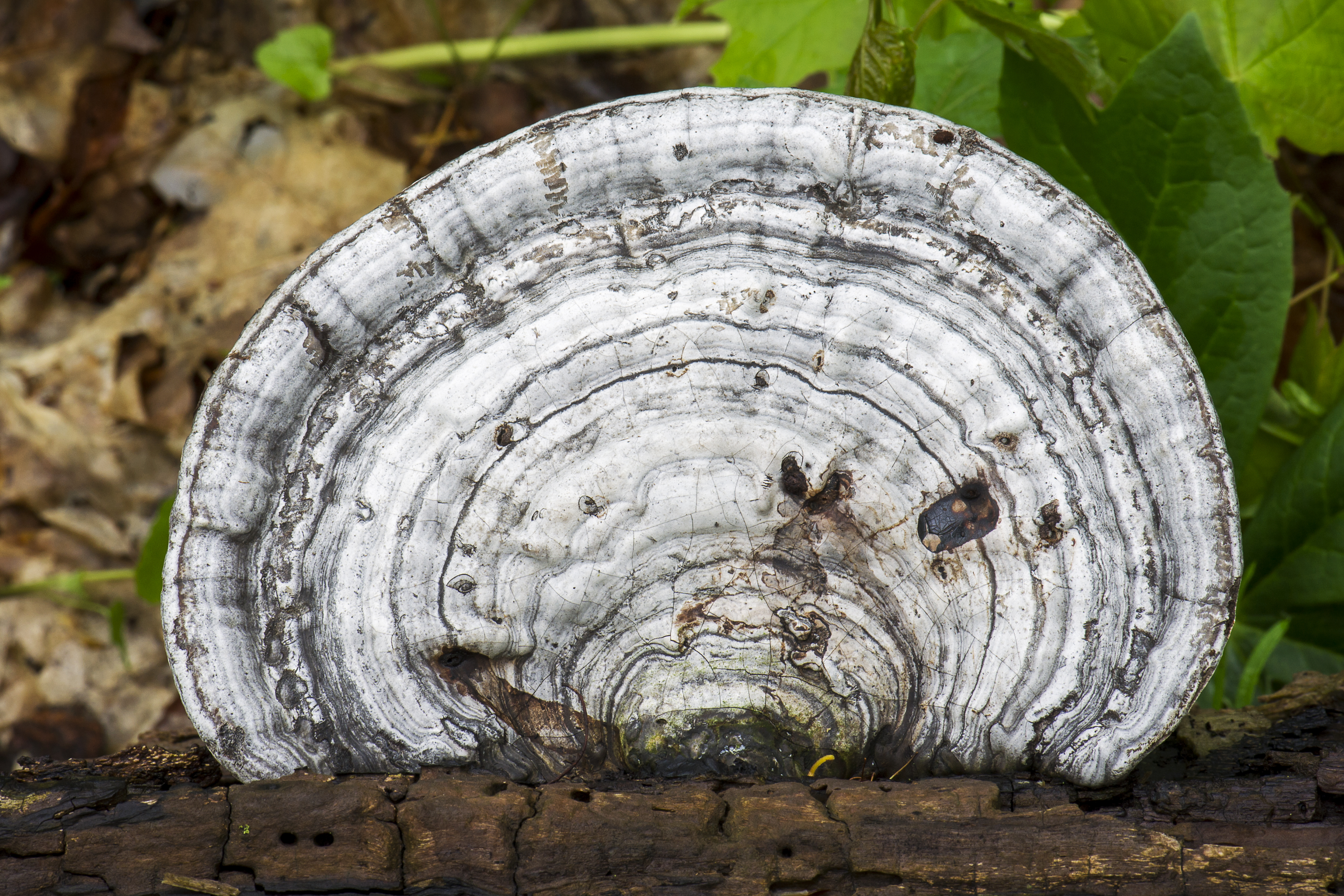

Scientific classification
- Domain: Eukaryota
- Kingdom: Fungi
- Division: Basidiomycota
- Class: Agaricomycetes
- Order: Polyporales
- Family: Ganodermataceae
- Genus: Ganoderma
- Species: G. megaloma

Binomial name
- Ganoderma megaloma (Lév.) Bres. (1912)

= Ganoderma megaloma =

Species of fungus

Ganoderma megaloma is a species of bracket fungus in the family Ganodermataceae.

The fungus was described as new to science in 1846 by mycologist Joseph-Henri Léveillé, with the holotype being collected in New York. It was moved into the genus Ganoderma by Giacomo Bresàdola in 1912. The species is closely related to Ganoderma applanatum.

G. megaloma is found in the eastern and midwestern United States. It causes white rot and butt rot on living hardwoods.
