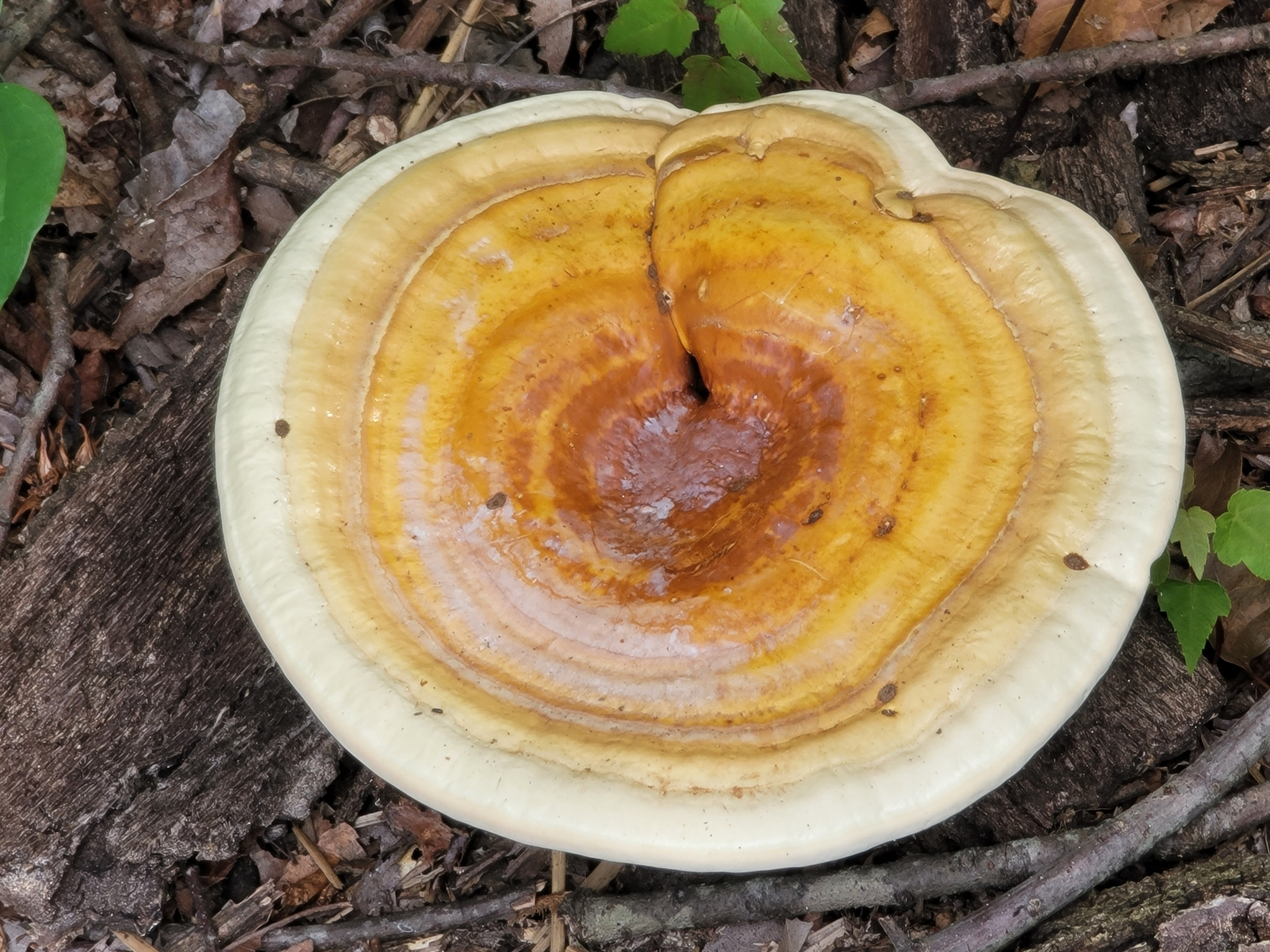
- Maryland, 2023

Scientific classification
- Kingdom: Fungi
- Division: Basidiomycota
- Class: Agaricomycetes
- Order: Polyporales
- Family: Ganodermataceae
- Genus: Ganoderma
- Species: G. curtisii

Binomial name
- Ganoderma curtisii (Berk.) Murrill (1908)

Synonyms
- Polyporus curtisii Berk. (1849); Fomes curtisii (Berk.) Cooke (1885); Scindalma curtisii (Berk.) Kuntze (1898)

= Ganoderma curtisii =

Species of fungus

Ganoderma curtisii
- Mycological characteristics
- Pores on hymenium
- Cap is offset
- Hymenium is decurrent or subdecurrent
- Stipe is bare
- Spore print is brown
- Ecology is saprotrophic

Ganoderma curtisii is a wood-decaying polypore found in eastern North America.

== Taxonomy ==
The name was originally established by Miles Berkeley in 1849 as Polyporus curtisii, and later transferred to the genus Ganoderma by William Alphonso Murrill in 1908. This species is tentative and is a subject of debate as to its viability as a distinct species from North American specimens described as G. lucidum (G. sessile), which is much more widely distributed throughout the US. There is also debate about the identities of several species that resemble G. lucidum and G. tsugae.

One reason for an alleged synonymy between G. sessile and G. curtisii is overlap in habitat, decaying hardwoods. According to Volk, Gilbertson and Ryvarden, authors of North American Polypores, it is not considered a separate species from G. lucidum. Bessette et al., authors of Mushrooms of the Southeastern United States, echo this and list it as a synonym to G. lucidum. Paul Stamets considers G. lucidum and G. curtisii to both be members of a tight-knit species complex.

However, several recent molecular studies have shown Ganoderma curtisii to be genetically distinct from G. lucidum, calling into doubt the synonymy of the two species and supporting previous mycologists' opinion that it is a distinct species. The same studies support the idea that G. lucidum sensu stricto is actually absent from the North American continent and that the mushroom widely called G. lucidum in North America is instead G. sessile, a member of the Ganoderma resinaceum complex, with G. curtisii as a separate species.

== Description ==
This polypore bears a marked resemblance to G. lucidum and generally has a stipe, sometimes lacking the characteristic red to purple varnished appearance that G. lucidum possesses. The flesh is spongy in pore tissue and firm in the stipe. The pores bruise brown when damaged.

Its habitat of choice is decaying stumps and roots of hardwoods, which aligns perfectly with that of G. sessile.

== Distribution and habitat ==
The species is primarily found in the Southeastern United States. Craig and Levetin claim to have observed it in Oklahoma.
