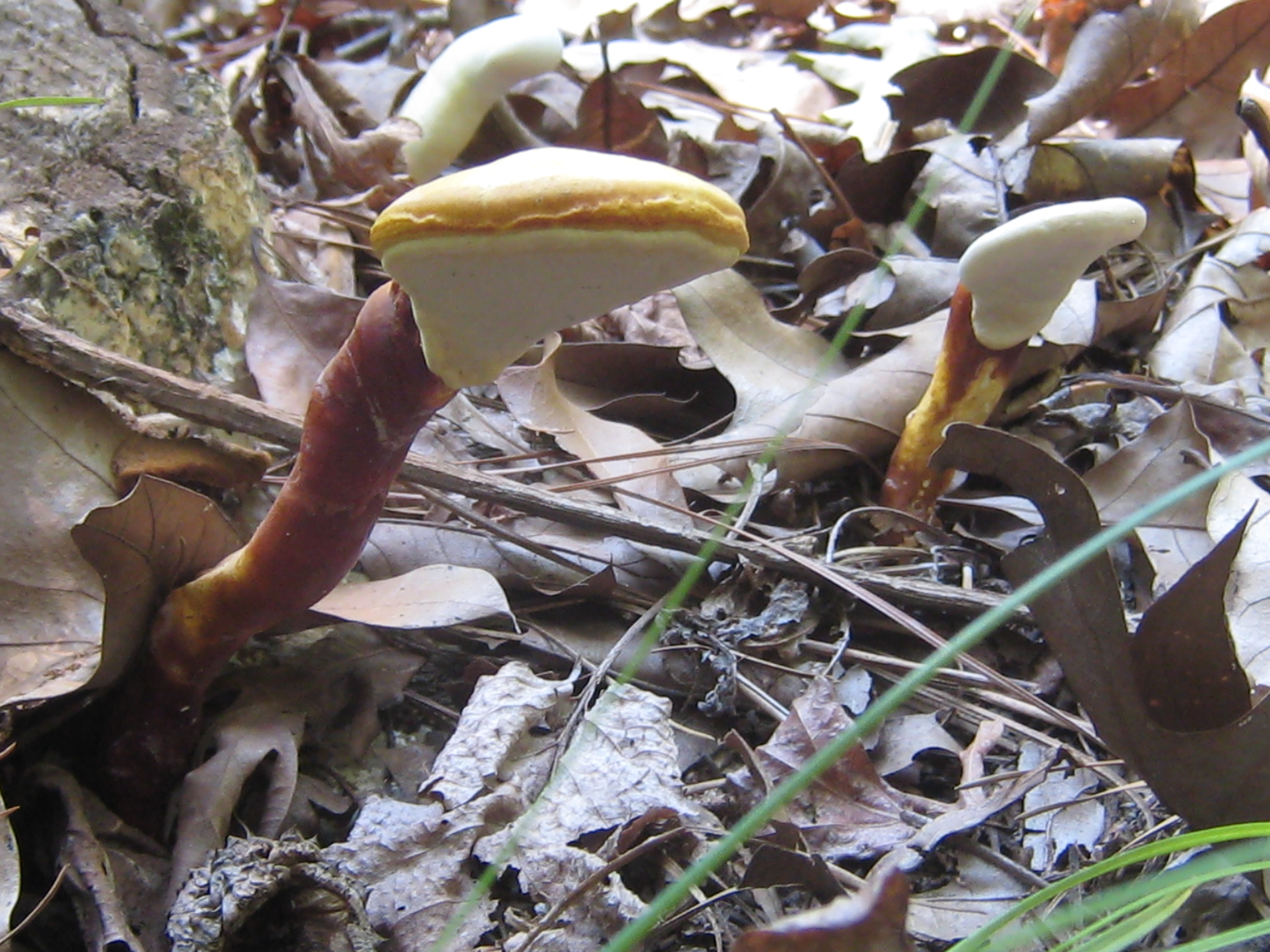

Scientific classification
- Domain: Eukaryota
- Kingdom: Fungi
- Division: Basidiomycota
- Class: Agaricomycetes
- Order: Polyporales
- Family: Ganodermataceae
- Genus: Ganoderma
- Species: G. meredithiae

Binomial name
- Ganoderma meredithiae Adask. & Gilb. (1988)

= Ganoderma meredithiae =

Species of fungus

Ganoderma meredithiae is a species of bracket fungus in the family Ganodermataceae.

Described as new to science in 1988 by mycologists James E. Adaskaveg and Robert Lee Gilbertson, the holotype was collected in 1985 near Pineville, Louisiana. G. meredithiae is named in honor of mycologist Meredith Blackwell. The species' complete mitochondrial genome was published in 2015.

The fungus is found in the southeastern United States in the Gulf Coast region from east Texas to Georgia. It causes white rot and butt rot on living pines, including loblolly pine (Pinus taeda) and spruce pine (Pinus glabra).
