= Experimental biology =

Biology primarily based on experiments

Experimental biology encompasses a set of approaches within the field of biology focused on conducting experiments to investigate and understand biological phenomena. This term contrasts with theoretical biology, which deals with mathematical modeling and abstractions of biological systems. The methodologies employed in experimental biology are diverse and multidisciplinary, including molecular, biochemical, biophysical, microscopic, and microbiological techniques.

Experimental biology is a branch of biology grounded in the application of the scientific method to formulate and test hypotheses through the controlled manipulation of variables in reproducible experiments. Unlike observational or theoretical approaches, this field emphasizes establishing causal relationships between biological phenomena via rigorous experimental designs. The formulation of testable questions and systematic data collection are critical to ensuring experimental validity. Rigorous application of this method reduces uncertainty in biological research and yields quantifiable, reproducible results.

Experimental design in biology requires the implementation of controls, replication, and randomization to minimize bias. The inclusion of control groups and comparison with experimental treatments enable attribution of specific effects to manipulated variables. Randomization in sample and treatment allocation prevents systematic biases that could compromise result interpretation. Variable control is fundamental in biological experiments to ensure observed changes are directly attributable to the studied variable. Modern techniques have enhanced this process, enabling higher precision and reducing external factor interference. Standardized protocols and advanced analytical tools have improved the identification of causal relationships in biological systems.

Experimental reproducibility is a key requirement for scientific validity. In experimental biology, inadequate replication risks misinterpretation and hinders generalizable knowledge. Open data practices and detailed protocol publication have been proposed as strategies to enhance reproducibility.

The development of reproducible research practices and consensus-building strategies has gained prominence in the scientific community. Reports indicate that less than 10% of studies in this discipline publish reusable data, complicating result validation and collaboration. Promoting open data and FAIR (Findable, Accessible, Interoperable, Reusable) standards has been advocated to improve transparency. Within scientific publishing, experimental biology has undergone significant changes in recent decades. Increased data requirements for publication have extended timelines for researchers, particularly doctoral students and postdocs, to publish their first articles. This trend has sparked discussions on strategies to accelerate scientific dissemination without compromising quality.

== Gallery ==
Visualizing gravitropism in Pinus pinaster after artificially inclining the plant.

Grip strength measurement in the beetle Bolitotherus cornutus.

Observing an archerfish shooting at prey.

Measuring seed dispersal caused by a passing car's slipstream.
