= Ganoderma philippii =

Scientific classification
- Kingdom: Fungi
- Division: Basidiomycota
- Class: Agaricomycetes
- Order: Polyporales
- Family: Ganodermataceae
- Genus: Ganoderma
- Species: G. philippii

Binomial name
- Ganoderma philippii (Bres. & Henn. ex Sacc.) Bres.

Synonyms
- Fomes philippii Bres. & Henn. ex Sacc.; Fomes pseudoferreus Wakef.; Ganoderma pseudoferreum (Wakef.) Overeem & B.A. Steinm.; Scindalma philippii (Bres. & Henn. ex Sacc.) Kuntze

Species of fungus

Ganoderma philippii is a species of fungus.
