= Meredith Blackwell =

American mycologist

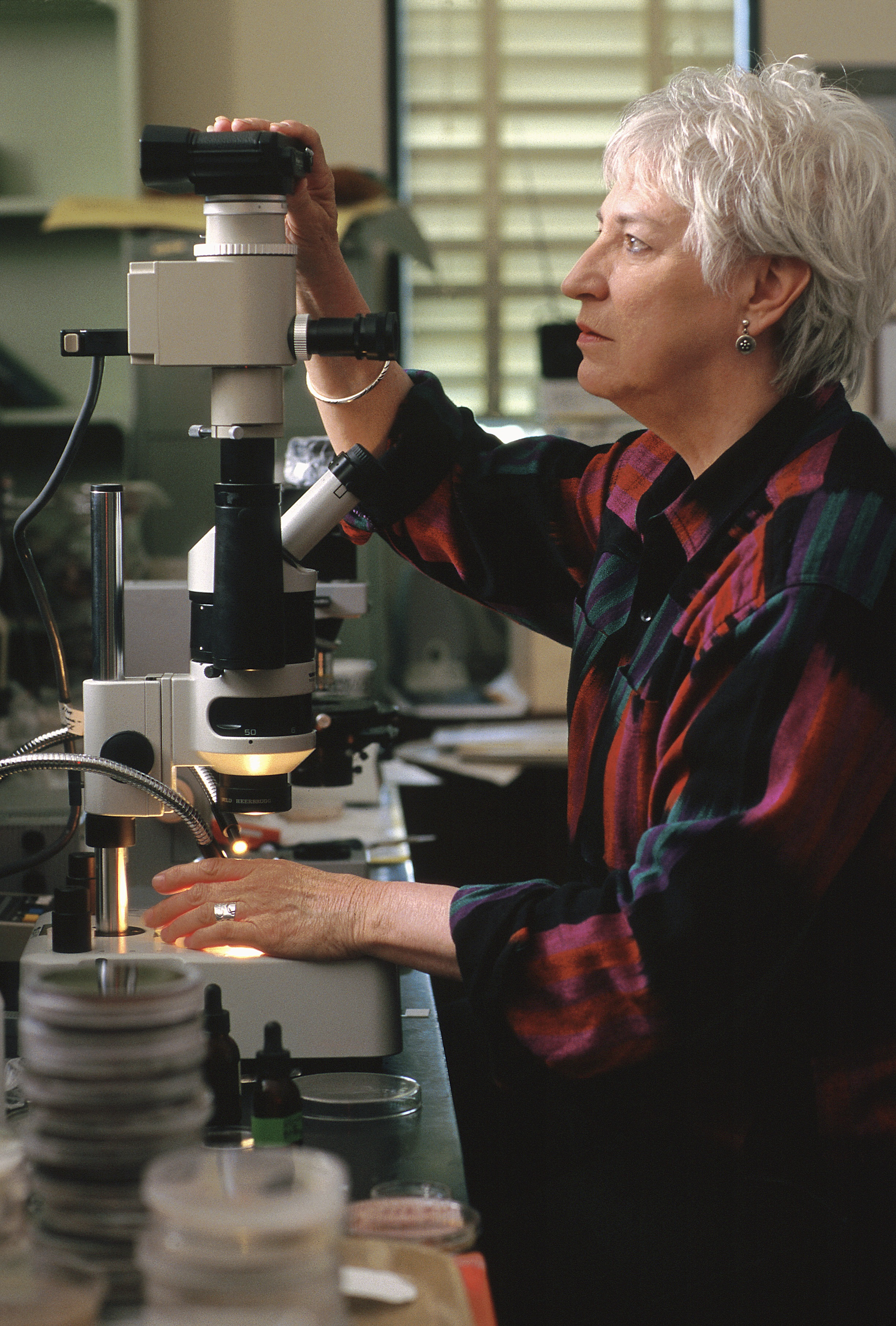
- Born: March 27, 1940
- Scientific career
- Fields: mycology; botany
- Author abbrev. (botany): M.Blackw.

Meredith May Blackwell (born 1940) is an American mycologist, known as one of the world's leading experts on fungi associated with arthropods.

== Education and career ==
Meredith Blackwell graduated in 1961 with B.S. in biology from the University of Southwestern Louisiana, Lafayette and in 1963 with M.S. in biology from the University of Alabama in Tuscaloosa. She graduated in 1973 with Ph.D. in botany from the University of Texas at Austin with thesis "A Developmental and Taxonomic Study of Protophysarum phloiogenum" under the supervision of C. J. Alexopoulos.

At the University of Florida, Blackwell was an electron microscopist from 1972 to 1974 and an assistant in botany from 1974 to 1975. She was an assistant professor at Hope College from 1975 to 1981. At Louisiana State University, she was an associate professor of botany from 1981 to 1985, a full professor of botany from 1998 to 1997, and Boyd Professor in the Department of Biological Sciences from 1997 to 2014, when she retired as Boyd Professor Emeritus. Since 2014 she has been an adjunct professor at the University of South Carolina in Columbia.

She was president of the Mycological Society of America from 1992 to 1993 and president of the International Mycological Association from 1998 to 2002. She served as an editor for Molecular Phylogenetics and Evolution (1992–1999), Mycologia (1995–1997), Journal of African Mycology and Biotechnology (1998–2006), and Systematics and Geography of Plants (1999–2006).

Blackwell is the co-editor of four books and the author or co-author of numerous scientific articles on such topics as termite-associated fungi, earwig-associated fungi, fungal infections of trees, molecular phylogeny of fungi, beetle-associated yeasts, and fungal evolution and taxonomy.

== Awards and honors ==
- 1983 — Alexopoulos Prize of the Mycological Society of America
- 1996 — Centenary Fellow of the British Mycological Society
- 1998 — Fellow of the American Association for the Advancement of Science
- 2007 — Fellow of the Mycological Society of America
- 2012 — Fellow of the American Academy of Arts and Sciences
- 2014 — Fellow of the International Mycological Association
- 2014 — De Bary Medal for life achievement from the International Mycological Association
- 2018 — Festschrift in Honor of Meredith Blackwell published in Mycologia

== Eponyms ==
=== Genera ===
- Blackwellomyces
- Meredithblackwellia Toome & Aime (type of Fungi) - Mycologia Vol.105 (Issue 2) on page 490 in 2013.
- Meredithiella McNew, C.Mayers & T.C.Harr. (type of Fungi) - Fungal Biology Vol.119 (Issue 11) on page 1086 in 2015.

=== Species ===
- Cadophora meredithiae
- Cordyceps blackwelliae
- Diphymyces blackwelliae
- Ganoderma meredithiae
- Kodamaea meredithiae
- Prolixandromyces blackwelliae
- Septobasidium meredithiae
