= Ganoderma zonatum =

- Ganoderma zonatum fruiting at the base of a palm tree

Scientific classification
- Domain: Eukaryota
- Kingdom: Fungi
- Division: Basidiomycota
- Class: Agaricomycetes
- Order: Polyporales
- Family: Ganodermataceae
- Genus: Ganoderma
- Species: G. zonatum

Binomial name
- Ganoderma zonatum Murrill (1902)

Synonyms
- Ganoderma sulcatum Murrill (1902); Fomes zonatus (Murrill) Sacc. & D.Sacc. (1905); Ganoderma tumidum Bres. (1911); Polyporus lucidus var. zonatus (Murrill) Overh. (1953)

Species of fungus

Ganoderma zonatum is a plant pathogen that infects the palm species causing butt rot. It is a fungus that infects the bottom 122–152 centimeters (4–5 feet) of the plant also rotting the roots. It has been known to be in both natural and planted environments and in the majority of cases only in palms.

== Symptoms and diagnosis ==
Symptoms of Ganoderma zonatum are general decline in the health of a plant, wilting and discoloration of the leaves and slow growth. However, this is noticeable in many different plant diseases and can not be used as a diagnosis tool. There are only two ways to fully identify G. zonatum. One is the basidiocarp (or conk) forming on the plant with the other viewing the internal rotting of the palm on the inside once it has been cut down.

== Life cycle ==
The fungus is spread between the plants due to the spores produced in the basidiocarp. The spores land on the soil and germinate. The hyphae then grow over the plant roots and up into the woody trunk. The fungus damages the palm trunk closest to the soil first, expands in diameter and moves up the center of the trunk causing a cone like shape of infected trunk. When the basidiocarp emerges it is at the highest point when the fungus will internally grow.

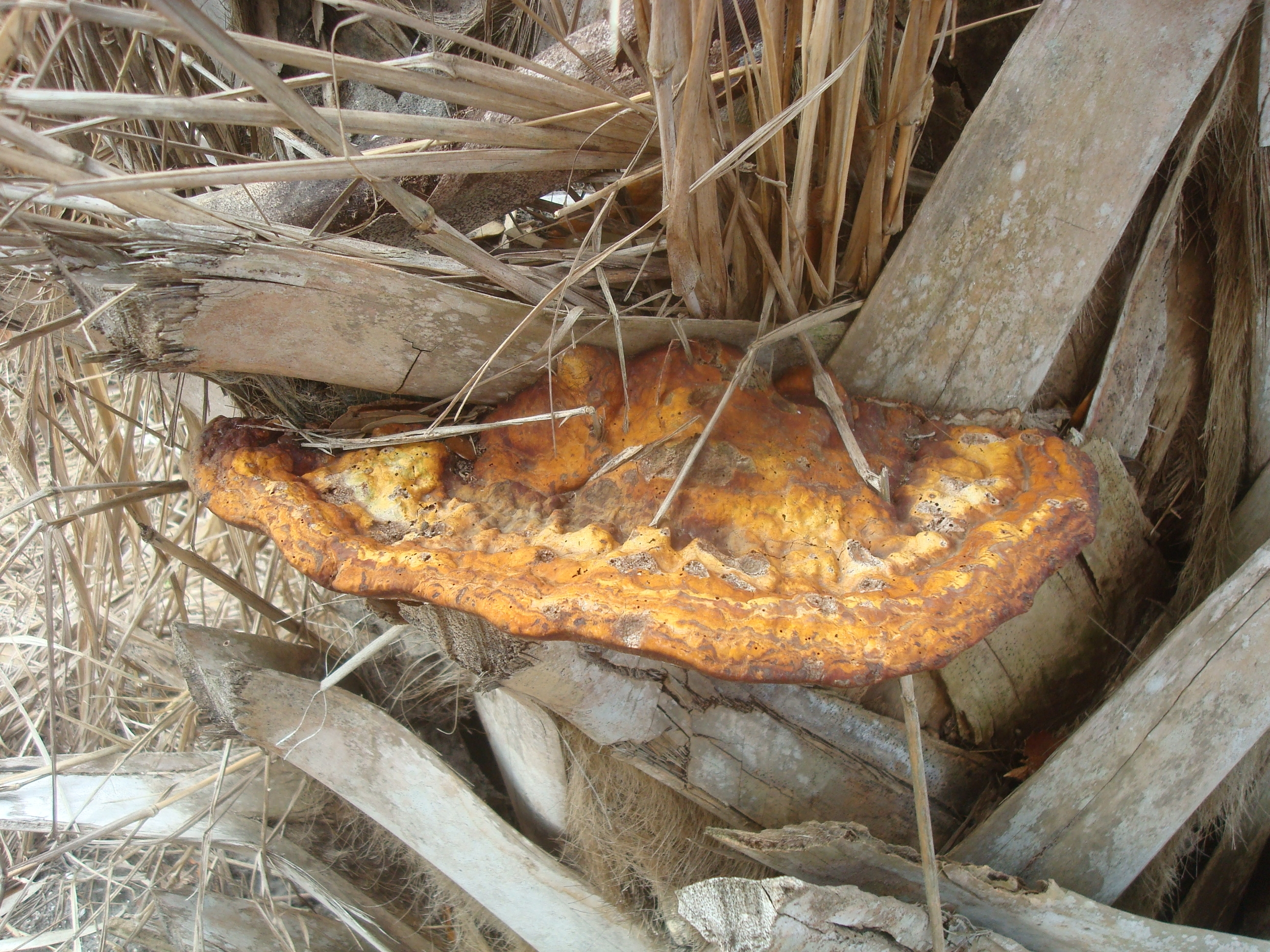
Growing on a sabal palm in Manatee County, Florida

== Protecting plants ==
There is currently no method for the control of G. zonatum once it has been identified. However minimizing the amount of moisture can decrease the risk of a palm becoming infected by the fungus. In places where a palm has been infected with G. zonatum, no other palm should be planted as the spores can survive in the soil. Some other prevention methods include:

- Avoiding injury to the trunks of palm trees.
- Being careful when using lawnmowers and other gardening equipment.
- Consulting forestry officers after infestation for their advice.

== Disposing of infected wood ==
After fungal infection, the wood above the butt area can be easily mulched with caution, but for the lower 1.2–1.8 meters (4–6 feet) extreme care should be taken to prevent the fungus from spreading. The wood should be wrapped in plastic before disposal, using gloves and sterile tools, which should be sterilized afterwards to avoid spreading to other palms.
