= Ganoderma sinense =

Scientific classification
- Kingdom: Fungi
- Division: Basidiomycota
- Class: Agaricomycetes
- Order: Polyporales
- Family: Ganodermataceae
- Genus: Ganoderma
- Species: G. sinense

Binomial name
- Ganoderma sinense J.D. Zhao, L.W. Hsu & X.Q. Zhang, Acta Microbiol. Sin. 19(3): 272 (1979)

Synonyms
- Ganoderma formosanum T.T. Chang & T. Chen

Species of fungus

Ganoderma sinense
- Mycological characteristics
- Pores on hymenium
- Cap is offset
- Hymenium attachment is irregular or not applicable
- Stipe is bare
- Spore print is brown
- Ecology is saprotrophic
- Edibility is edible or edible, but unpalatable

Ganoderma sinense is a black to purplish-black or dark brown laccate species of Ganoderma found in China, Japan and Taiwan growing on decaying wood of broad-leaved trees and pine stumps. It is used in traditional Asian medicine, where it is known as zizhi (紫芝, purple Ganoderma) in Chinese.

== Taxonomy ==
Ganoderma sinense was erected as a species in 1979 by J.D. Zhao, L.W. Hsu, and X.Q. Zhang, distinguishing it from Ganoderma dimidiatum (formerly G. japonicum) by morphology.

One recent genetic study of two dozen samples collected in China and identified as G. sinense and G. japonicum by morphology showed all samples were the same species, G. sinense. The 20 of these identified as G. sinense showed a high variance in morphological features. Other studies have suggested that G. sinense and G. japonicum are the same species, based on their high sequence similarity in ITS data. However, because DNA samples collected in Japan under G. japonicum's revised name, G. dimediatum, were not available to test and compare to G. sinense, the authors believe is too early to determine that G. dimediatum and G. sinense are indeed synonyms.

== Description ==
The basidiocarp is annual, stipitate, and corky–woody.

The pileus (cap) is semicircular and measures 2.5–0.5 by 5.2–9 centimetres (1–0 by 2–3 1/2 inches) and is 9.2–1.2 cm (3.62–0.47 in) thick in nature. When cultivated, it measures 2.5–6.5 by 3.5–12 centimetres (1–2 1/2 by 1 1/2–4 1/2 inches) and is 0.5–1.5 cm (0.20–0.59 in) thick. The upper surface of the cap is usually purplish black to black or dark brown, laccate, concentrically sulcate or not, radially rugose, margin often subtruncated.

The pore surface is pale brown to dark brown, with grey-brown tubes up to 1.4 cm long. There are 5-6 pores per millimetre, circular, 50–180 μm in diameter, with dissepiments 40–160 μm thick.

The stipe is 6–19 cm (2.4–7.5 in) long and 0.5–1.0 cm (0.20–0.39 in) thick, lateral, dorsolateral or eccentric, cylindrical or flattened: the same color as the pileus and also laccate.

Context tissue is 1–5 mm thick, uniformly brown or red brown near the tube layer or with whitish streaks and patches near the cutis. The hyphal system is trimitic, with generative hyphae 3–5 μm in diameter, hyaline, thin-walled, with clamp connections. Skeletal hyphae measure 4.5–7 μm in diameter, and are golden brown in 5% KOH solution and are dextrinoid in Molder's reagent. Ligative hyphae are 1–2.5 μm in diameter, thick-walled, and much branched.

Basidiospores measure 10.5–13.5 by 7–9 μm including endosporium, and 8–9 by 5.5–7. μm excluding. The myxosporium is ovoid and brown with a dark brown eusporium bearing few and thick echinulae, overlaid by a hyaline myxosporium, truncate or not at the apex. Basidia are not seen. Cutis hymeniodermic elements are 20–60 by 4–8 μm, clavate and amyloid in Melzer's reagent.

== Uses ==
G. sinense has been used in traditional Chinese medicine since ancient times, appearing in the Shennong Ben Cao Jing, written in the third century CE. It also appears in the 11th century CE materia medica, Ben Cao Gang Mu, by Song dynasty physician Tang Shenwei, among others.

G. sinense has wide applications in traditional Chinese medicine, as it is believed to strengthen the body's immune system and disease response while regulating metabolism and normalizing organ function. Diseases treated by G. sinense involve respiratory, circulatory, digestive, nervous, endocrine and immune systems, including internal, external, gynecological, pediatric and dermatological diseases. It is also believed to be useful for platelet-aggregation and as an anti-thrombotic, hepatic-protective, antioxidant, anti-aging, anti-inflammatory, anti-tumor and anti-radiation agent.

In 2010, a G. sinense polysaccharide tablet was approved by China's State Food and Drug Administration for use as an adjunctive therapeutic drug for treating leukopenia and hematopoietic injury caused by concurrent chemo/radiation therapy during cancer treatment.
