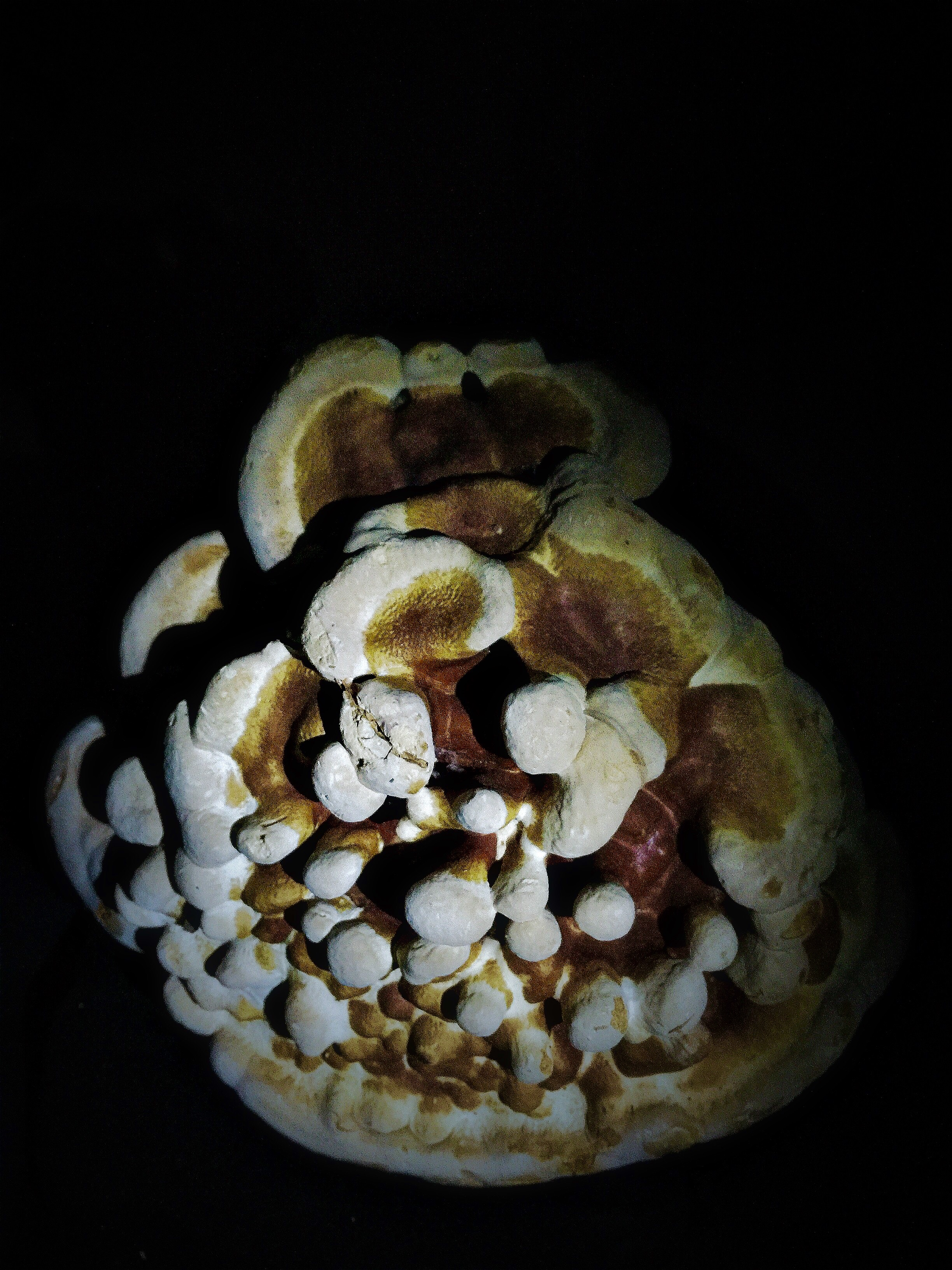

Scientific classification
- Domain: Eukaryota
- Kingdom: Fungi
- Division: Basidiomycota
- Class: Agaricomycetes
- Order: Polyporales
- Family: Ganodermataceae
- Genus: Ganoderma
- Species: G. multipileum

Binomial name
- Ganoderma multipileum Ding Hou (1950)

= Ganoderma multipileum =

Species of fungus

Ganoderma multipileum Mycological characteristics
- Pores on hymenium
- Cap is offset or indistinct
- Hymenium attachment is irregular or not applicable
- Stipe is bare or lacks a stipe
- Spore print is brown
- Ecology is saprotrophic or parasitic
- Edibility is edible

Ganoderma multipileum, commonly known as lingzhi or chizhi, is a species of polypore mushroom.

Formerly known as Ganoderma lucidum, phylogenetic analyses published in 2009 revealed that G. lucidum is primarily a European species, and that the name has been incorrectly applied to Asian collections.

G. multipileum is found in tropical Asia. It has been used as a medicinal mushroom for over 2,000 years.
