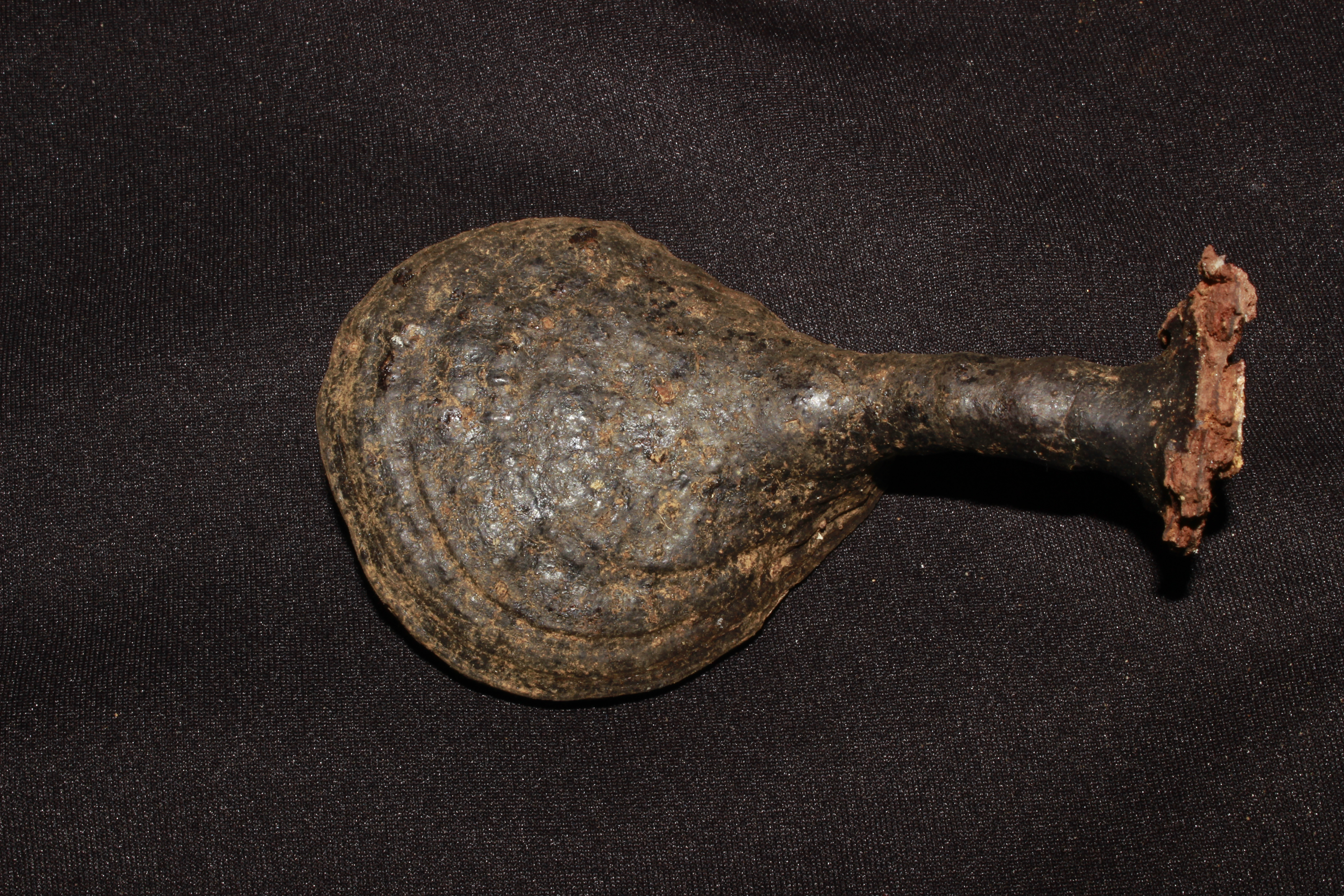

Scientific classification
- Kingdom: Fungi
- Division: Basidiomycota
- Class: Agaricomycetes
- Order: Polyporales
- Family: Ganodermataceae
- Genus: Ganoderma
- Species: G. orbiforme

Binomial name
- Ganoderma orbiforme (Fr.) Ryvarden (2000)

Synonyms
- Polyporus orbiformis Fr. (1838); Fomes orbiformis (Fr.) Cooke (1885); Fomes lucidus f. boninensis Pat. (1888); Fomes lucidus f. noukahivensis Pat. (1888); Ganoderma boninense Pat. (1889); Ganoderma noukahivense Pat. (1889); Scindalma orbiforme (Fr.) Kuntze (1898); Ganoderma lucidum var. orbiformis (Fr.) Rick (1960)

= Ganoderma orbiforme =

Shelf fungus, worst disease of oilpalm

Ganoderma orbiforme – most commonly known as G. boninense or just Ganoderma in oil palm pathology – is a species of polypore fungus that is widespread across southeast Asia. It is a plant pathogen that causes basal stem rot, a disease of the African oil palm (Elaeis guineensis). The fungus was first described scientifically in 1838 by Elias Magnus Fries from collections made in Guinea. Leif Ryvarden transferred it to the genus Ganoderma in 2000. In addition to its type locality, the fungus has also been collected from the Bonin Islands in the Pacific, and from Venezuela and Puerto Rico.

== Transmission ==
G. orbiforme is not a soil borne pathogen, meaning it does not grow in soil and does not infiltrate from soil and into the root system. It is however also not killed by soil, and will reside in dead, buried palm trunk material. This has especially been observed when Oryctes rhinoceros-infested material was buried.

== Infection ==
G. orbiforme has a hemibiotrophic lifestyle in E. guineensis. During an invasion, E. guineensis roots stockpile salicylic acid, which is a signal to downregulate its own expression of ascorbate oxidase and ascorbate peroxidase. AO and AP are reactive oxygen species scavengers, and so the total effect is to increase ROS production. This entire pathway was found by Ho et al., 2016. Increased ROS is effective against hemibiotrophs but counterproductive against necrotrophs.

== Genetics ==
Microsatellite markers have been developed to help identify the fungus and study the genetic diversity of G. orbiforme.

== Research ==
Water agar is usable for isolation of this fungus, and is the simplest and cheapest. CABI provides research and technique information for lab work with this pathogen.
