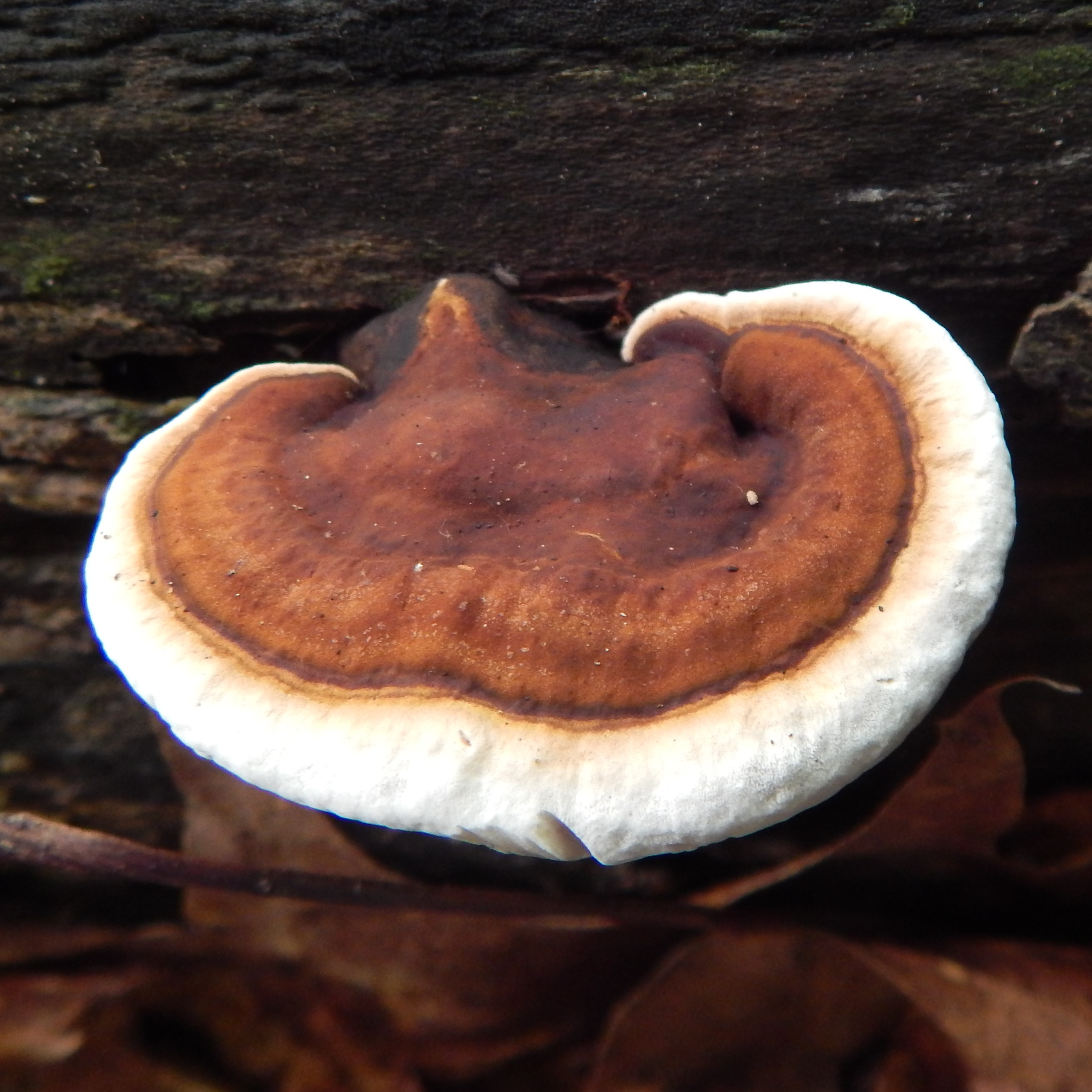
- Ganoderma lobatum found at Jerusalem Mill Village, Kingsville, Maryland, United States

Scientific classification
- Domain: Eukaryota
- Kingdom: Fungi
- Division: Basidiomycota
- Class: Agaricomycetes
- Order: Polyporales
- Family: Ganodermataceae
- Genus: Ganoderma
- Species: G. lobatum

Binomial name
- Ganoderma lobatum (Schwein.) G.F. Atk., (1908)

Synonyms
- Elfvingia lobata (Schwein.) Murrill, (1908); Fomes lobatus (Schwein.) Cooke, (1885); Polyporus lobatus Schwein., (1832); Scindalma lobatum (Schwein.) Kuntze, (1898)

= Ganoderma lobatum =

Species of fungus

Ganoderma lobatum is a fungal plant pathogen.
