= Ganoderma adspersum =

Scientific classification
- Domain: Eukaryota
- Kingdom: Fungi
- Division: Basidiomycota
- Class: Agaricomycetes
- Order: Polyporales
- Family: Ganodermataceae
- Genus: Ganoderma
- Species: G. adspersum

Binomial name
- Ganoderma adspersum (Schulzer) Donk

Synonyms
- Ganoderma australe s.Ryvarden et al.; Ganoderma europaeum Steyaert; Polyporus adspersus Schulzer

Species of fungi

Ganoderma adspersum is a species of fungi.
