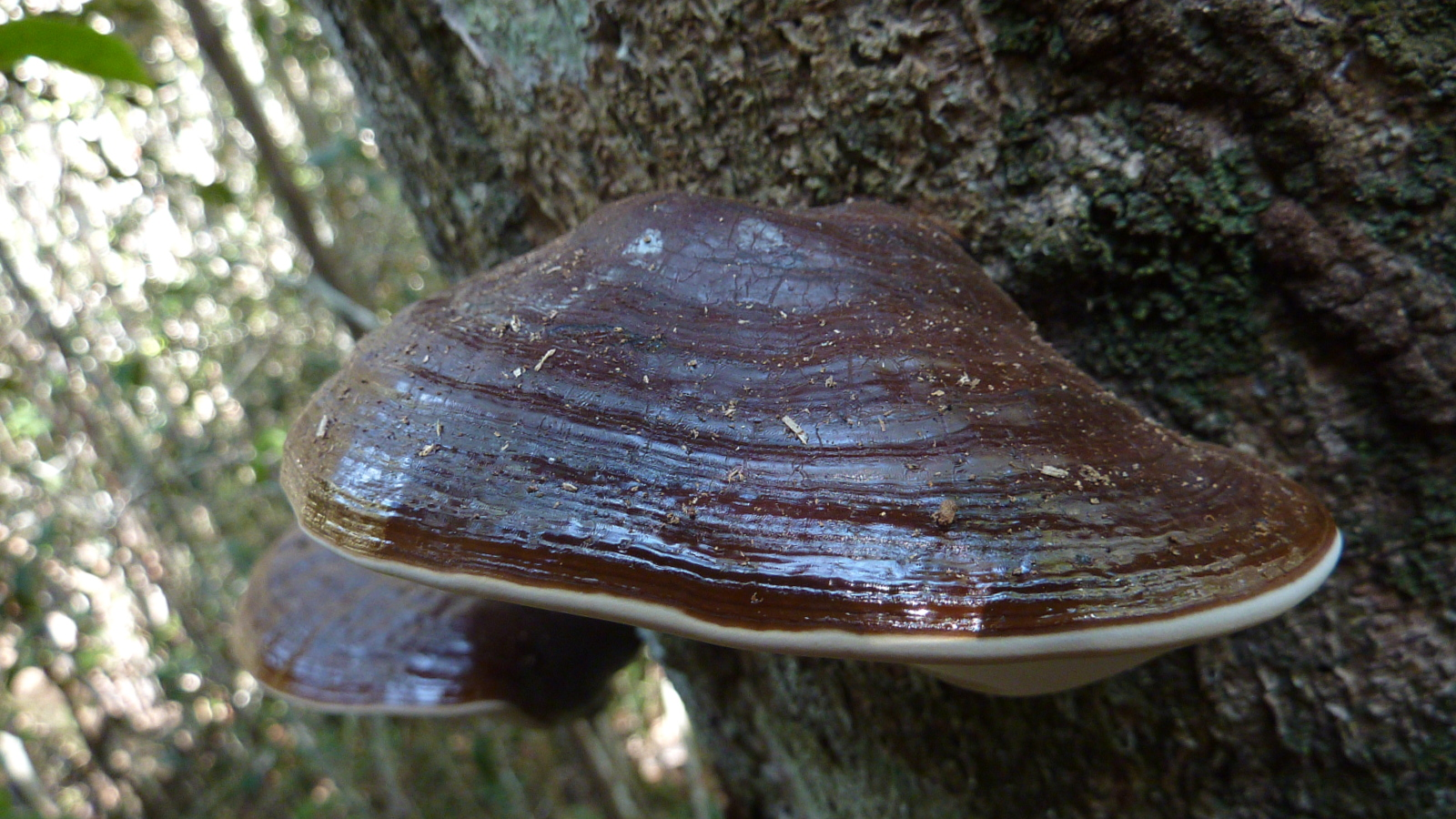

Scientific classification
- Kingdom: Fungi
- Division: Basidiomycota
- Class: Agaricomycetes
- Order: Polyporales
- Family: Ganodermataceae
- Genus: Ganoderma
- Species: G. australe

Binomial name
- Ganoderma australe (Fr.) Pat.

Synonyms
- List: ? australe Fr.; Elfvingia australis (Fr.) G.Cunn.; Elfvingia tornata (Pers.) Murrill; Fomes annularis Lloyd; Fomes applanatus subsp. australis (Fr.) Cleland & Cheel, 1917; Fomes applanatus var. australis (Fr.) Cleland & Cheel; Fomes applanatus var. oroflavus (Lloyd) Cleland & Cheel; Fomes arculatus (Bres.) Sacc.; Fomes australis (Fr.) Cooke; Fomes australis subsp. arculatus (Bres.) Sacc.; Fomes australis var. oroflavus (Lloyd) G.Cunn.; Fomes oroflavus Lloyd; Fomes polyzonus Lloyd; Fomes pseudoaustralis Lloyd; Fomes scansilis (Berk.) Cooke; Fomes undatus Lázaro Ibiza; Ganoderma annulare (Lloyd) Boedijn; Ganoderma applanatum f. australe (Fr.) Bourdot & Galzin; Ganoderma applanatum subsp. australe (Fr.) Bourdot & Galzin; Ganoderma applanatum subsp. tornatum (Pers.) Humphrey & Leus-Palo, 1931; Ganoderma applanatum var. tornatum (Pers.) C.J.Humphrey & Leus-Palo; Ganoderma australe f. arculatum Bres.; Ganoderma polyzonum (Lloyd) Torrend; Ganoderma tornatum (Pers.) Bres.; Ganoderma tornatum subsp. tornatum (Pers.) Humphrey, 1931; Placodes australis (Fr.) Quél.; Polyporus australis Fr.; Polyporus scansilis Berk.; Polyporus tornatus Pers.; Scindalma arculatum (Bres.) Kuntze; Scindalma scansile (Berk.) Kuntze; Scindalma tornatum (Pers.) Kuntz

= Ganoderma australe =

Species of fungus

Ganoderma tornatum
- Mycological characteristics
- Pores on hymenium
- Hymenium attachment is not applicable
- Spore print is brown
- Ecology is parasitic
- Edibility is unknown

Ganoderma australe, the southern bracket, is a fungal plant pathogen in the genus Ganoderma. It is a species of basidiomycete fungi in the family Polyporaceae. Members are also known as bracket fungi, or polypores.

== Description ==
Like other polypores, its physical characteristics include a rigid and tough texture and a shelf-like appearance. Most specimens of G. australe have a dark brown upper surface, though the ones found in the northwest of India and Pakistan have a lighter appearance. G. australe also have thin, shiny horn-like layers, distinguishing them from G. applanatum. It does not have a long and thin stipe like G. cochlear.

Physiologically, their mode of transmission is likely primarily through air-borne spores, as no rhizomorphs have been found. While temperature increases decrease their spore size its spore size was found to be 7.5–9.5 x 5–7 micrometers in one sample. In addition to parasitizing oil palms, G. australe has a variety of hosts, in comparison to other Ganoderma species.

== Distribution and habitat ==
It is distributed widely throughout the tropics, appearing to be one of the most common species of Ganoderma there. Some places it occurs is south of the Sahara desert, the shores of the Pacific Ocean in Canada, and the north west of India and Pakistan, and from the Philippines to New Caledonia and Papua. It is not clear if this species occurs in South America, as few specimens are available.
