= Tang Shenwei =

Song dynasty Chinese physician (c.1056–1093)

- Chinese: 唐慎微
Transcriptions
Standard Mandarin
- Hanyu Pinyin: Táng Shènwēi

Tang Shenyuan
- Traditional Chinese: 唐審元
- Simplified Chinese: 唐审元
Transcriptions
Standard Mandarin
- Hanyu Pinyin: Táng Shěnyuán

Tang Shenwei (Chinese: 唐慎微; pinyin: Táng Shènwēi; c.1056-1093), courtesy name Shenyuan (simplified Chinese: 审元; traditional Chinese: 審元), was a Chinese physician of the Song dynasty. He compiled an influential pharmacopoeia, Zhenglei bencao (證類本草).

== Career ==
A page from Zhenglei bencao

Tang Shenwei was born in a family of professional physicians from Jinyuan (晉原; in today's Chongzhou, Sichuan). During the Yuanyou era (元祐; 1086–1094) of Emperor Zhezong's reign, he became a disciple of Li Duanbo and moved to Huayang near Chengdu.

== Zhenglei bencao ==
Zhenglei bencao
- Traditional Chinese: 證類本草
- Simplified Chinese: 证类本草
- Literal meaning: Collected classified materia medica
Transcriptions
Standard Mandarin
- Hanyu Pinyin: Zhènglèi běncǎo

Alternative Chinese name
- Traditional Chinese: 經史證類備急本草
- Simplified Chinese: 经史证类备急本草
Transcriptions
Standard Mandarin
- Hanyu Pinyin: Jīngshǐ zhènglèi bèijí běncǎo

Tang spent several years on studying books on pharmaceuticals to create his own compendium. He merged the entirety of some existing works and added information researched on his own to the compilation. The book was ready about 1082–1083. Its full title, Jingshi zhenglei beiji bencao (traditional Chinese: 經史證類備急本草; simplified Chinese: 经史证类备急本草) translates as "Ready-to-use pharmacopoeia, classified as collected from the Classics and historiographical books".

The compendium encompassed 1,748 different drugs (476 of which were not included in the previous texts) and beyond 4,000 treating methods. It quotes more than 240 ancient written sources, many of which are lost today. Part of the information hails from his own research. In the preface, Tang summarized the history of materia medica books and explained the way in which he carried out the compilation. Every drug entry includes the description of usage, function in the Chinese medicine framework, places or origin, methods of collection and preparation. 933 illustrations are included for easier identification. Some of the medical materials were not described before in any known book.

The book has spawned many editions, including state-sponsored revisions. It stayed influential for several centuries, even if outshined by the even more monumental Bencao gangmu of the Ming dynasty. Its author, Li Shizhen spoke about Tang Shenwei favorably.

== Depictions ==
Song dynasty official Yuwen Xuzhong (宇文虛中) described Tang Shenwei as "ugly in appearance and slow in demeanor and speech".

The Strange Doctor Tang Shenwei (怪医唐慎微), a 2014 film produced by CCTV6 and directed by Fang Junliang, depicts Tang Shenwei's life, with actor Ma Shuai in the title role.
