= Butt rot =

Fungal disease of plants

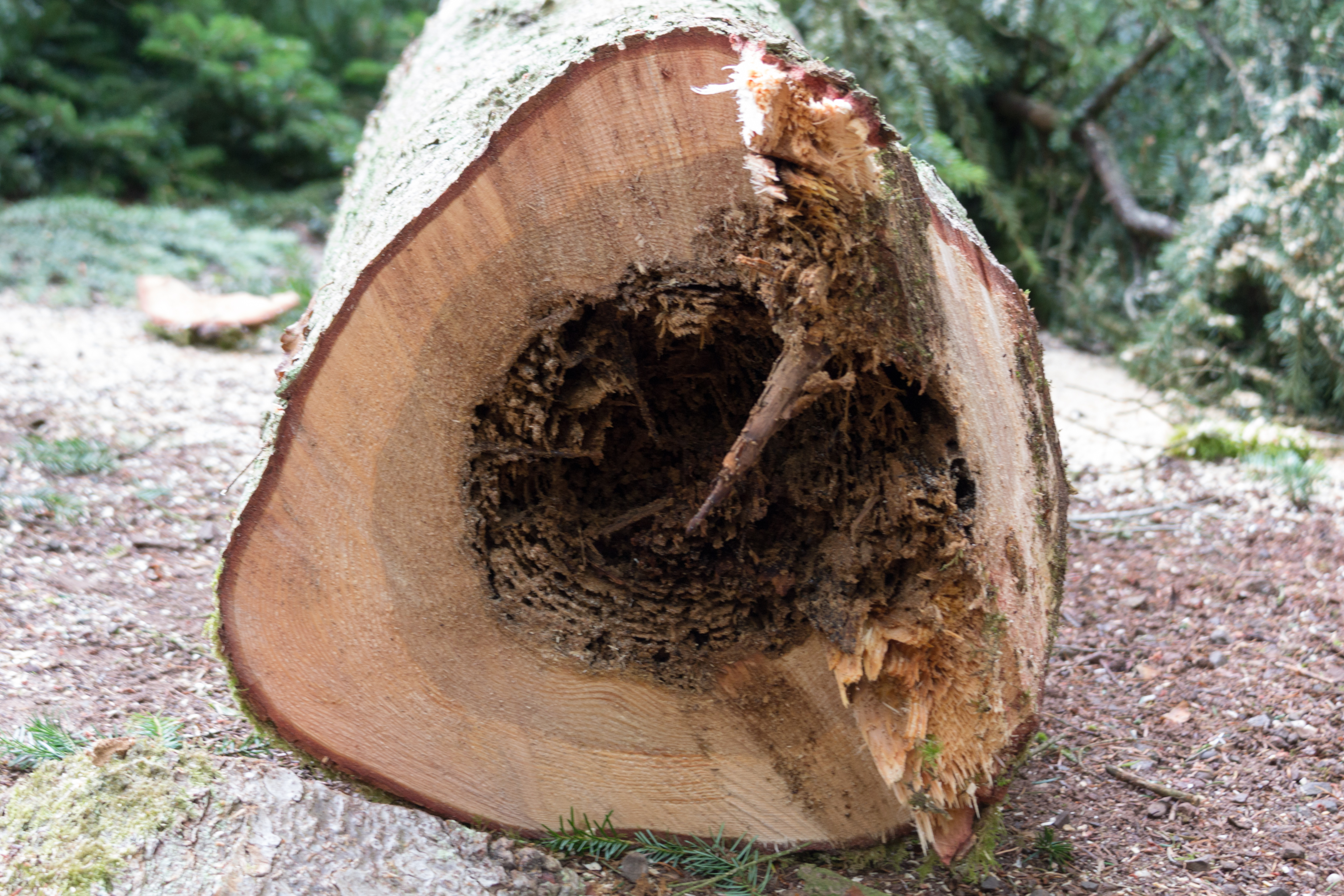
Rotted tree trunk

Butt rot is a disease of plants, mostly trees, caused by fungi. The fungus attacks the moist, poorly protected undersurface of a tree trunk's thickest part (the "butt" above the root, as opposed to "top"), where the end of the stem makes contact with the soil. It may affect the roots as well, causing a disease known as root rot. It then moves up into the interior of the plant, producing a roughly conical column of dead, rotted plant matter, up to one and a half meters long in severe cases. Such an infection is likely to impair the transport properties of the xylem tissue found at the center of the stem. It also weakens the stem and makes the plant more vulnerable to toppling. One particularly virulent species of fungus associated with butt rot is Serpula himantioides.

== Common causes ==
Fungi can enter the base of the tree through mechanical damage caused by lawn mowers, construction or logging.

Soil compaction may also lead to fungal infections as it may impact root health, making the tree more susceptible to infection.

A tree may also become weaker with old age, leading to higher chances of fungal infection.

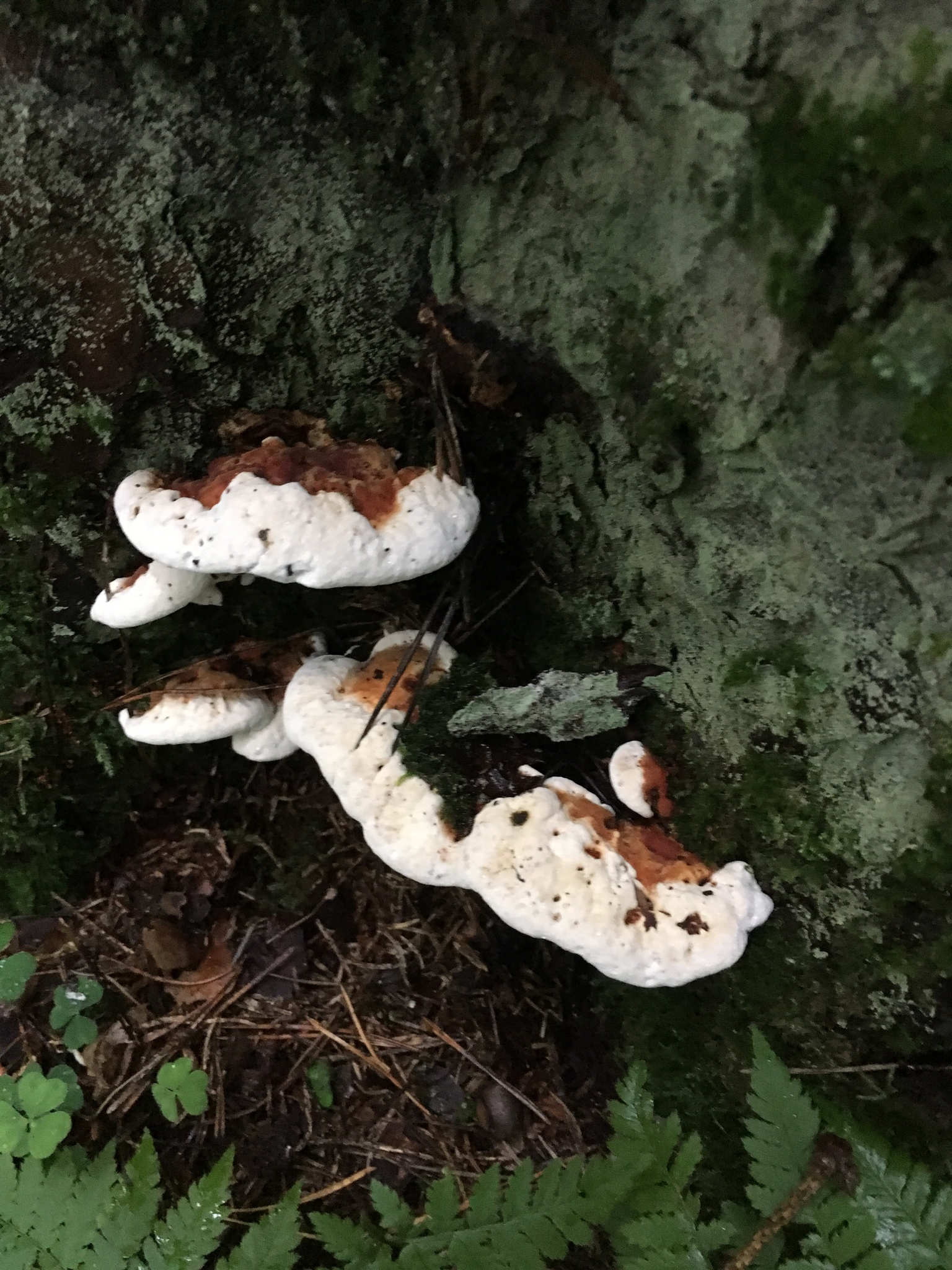
Heterobasidion annosum

== Specific fungi ==
Many fungal species are associated with butt rot, including:

- Ganoderma spp. which is common in hardwoods and palms.
- Armillaria spp., also known as honey fungus, has black, string-like rhizomorphs and can spread underground.
- Heterobasidion spp. is a major cause of both root and butt rot in conifers, so it is often associated with butt rot. This species spreads through airborne spores.
- Fomitopsis spp. is also commonly found in conifers and causes extensive decay.
- Phellinus spp. commonly infects oak and other hardwoods.

== Symptoms ==
Symptoms do not appear until the late stages of an infection, so it can make early detection extremely difficult. However, affected trees may show signs such as prematurely dropping leaves producing smaller than normal leaves, or canopy thinning in general. Fruiting bodies of fungi (conks) near the base of the tree may occur as well when decay becomes advanced.

== Treatment and diagnosis ==
Butt rot is a serious issue because it is largely undetectable in early stages and it cannot be fully cured. This makes early diagnosis extremely important to slow the spread of the infection. Detection efforts such as polymerase chain reaction (PCR) based methods have become increasingly popular. Other methods of diagnosis include resistograph drilling and sonic tomography. These are used to determine internal decay before outward symptoms begin to show.

Proper care of trees such as ensuring proper soil conditions, mitigating injury to trees, and using fungicides can be good preventative measures. Trees with extensive infection need to be monitored and removed if they are not structurally sound.

== Environmental significance ==
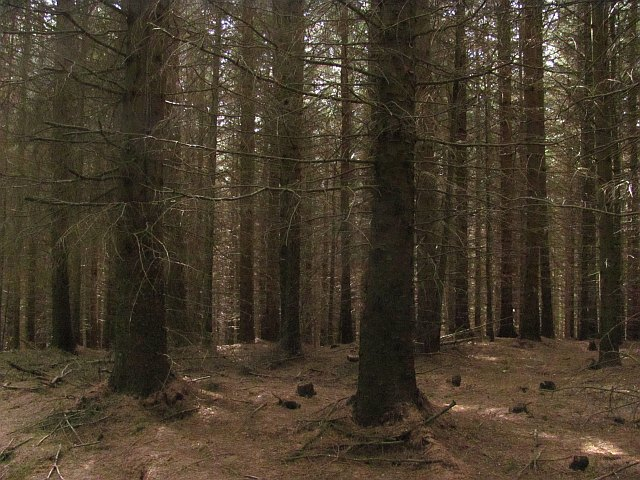
Conifer stand

Pre-commercial thinning in coniferous regions creates a new ecological niche for fungi to colonize, such as tree stumps. This may lead to increased risks of established trees becoming infected, particularly in areas where butt rot causing fungi are already present.

The presence of Armillaria on stumps of hardwood trees could endanger seedlings that are planted nearby. This can negatively impact ecosystems that rely on these trees. Additionally, diseased trees are more likely to fall as the base and roots weaken, leading to soil loss and vegetation loss.

Excessive butt rot within a tree population may also disrupt nutrient cycles due to excessive decay. This can greatly impact the balance of decomposition and regeneration in a forest.

== Economic impacts ==
The forestry industry can experience significant economic losses due to butt rot as it can lead to decreased timber quality, lowering the value of harvested wood, and loss in timber production as decayed wood is unsuitable to be sold.

In urban areas, diseased trees can be expensive to remove. This is due to them being structurally unsound, creating safety concerns and requiring specialized equipment and personnel to do the job. Many cities may also require permits to remove the trees along with disposal fees, further increasing the cost of removal.

== See also ==
- Ganoderma zonatum
- Phaeolus schweinitzii
