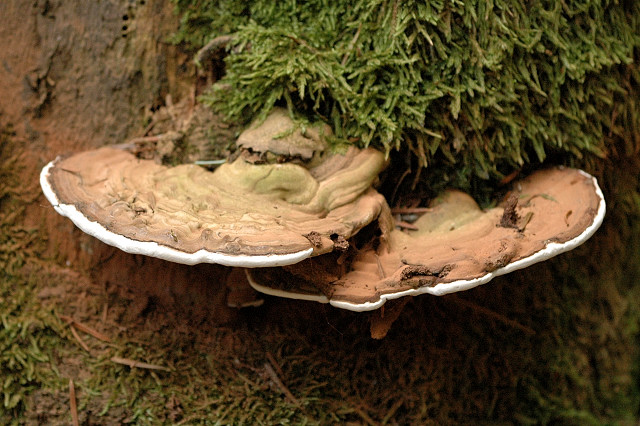
- Ganoderma applanatum

Scientific classification
- Kingdom: Fungi
- Division: Basidiomycota
- Class: Agaricomycetes
- Order: Polyporales
- Family: Ganodermataceae
- Genus: Ganoderma; P.Karst (1881)

Type species
- Ganoderma lucidum (Curtis) P.Karst. (1881)

Species
- Ganoderma alba
- Ganoderma annularis
- Ganoderma atrum
- Ganoderma aurea
- Ganoderma australe
- Ganoderma amboinense
- Ganoderma applanatum
- Ganoderma boninense
- Ganoderma brownii
- Ganoderma colossus
- Ganoderma cupreum
- Ganoderma curtisii
- Ganoderma formosanum
- Ganoderma gibbosum
- Ganoderma incrassatum
- Ganoderma lobatum
- Ganoderma lingzhi
- Ganoderma lucidum
- Ganoderma megaloma
- Ganoderma meredithiae
- Ganoderma microsporum
- Ganoderma miniatocinctum
- Ganoderma multipileum
- Ganoderma neo-japonicum
- Ganoderma nigrolucidum
- Ganoderma orbiforme
- Ganoderma oregonense
- Ganoderma purpurea
- Ganoderma pfeifferi
- Ganoderma philippii
- Ganoderma pseudoferreum
- Ganoderma resinaceum
- Ganoderma rubra
- Ganoderma sessile
- Ganoderma sichuanense
- Ganoderma sinense
- Ganoderma steyaertanum
- Ganoderma tornatum
- Ganoderma tsugae
- Ganoderma viridis
- Ganoderma weberianum
- Ganoderma zonatum

= Ganoderma =

Genus of mushroom

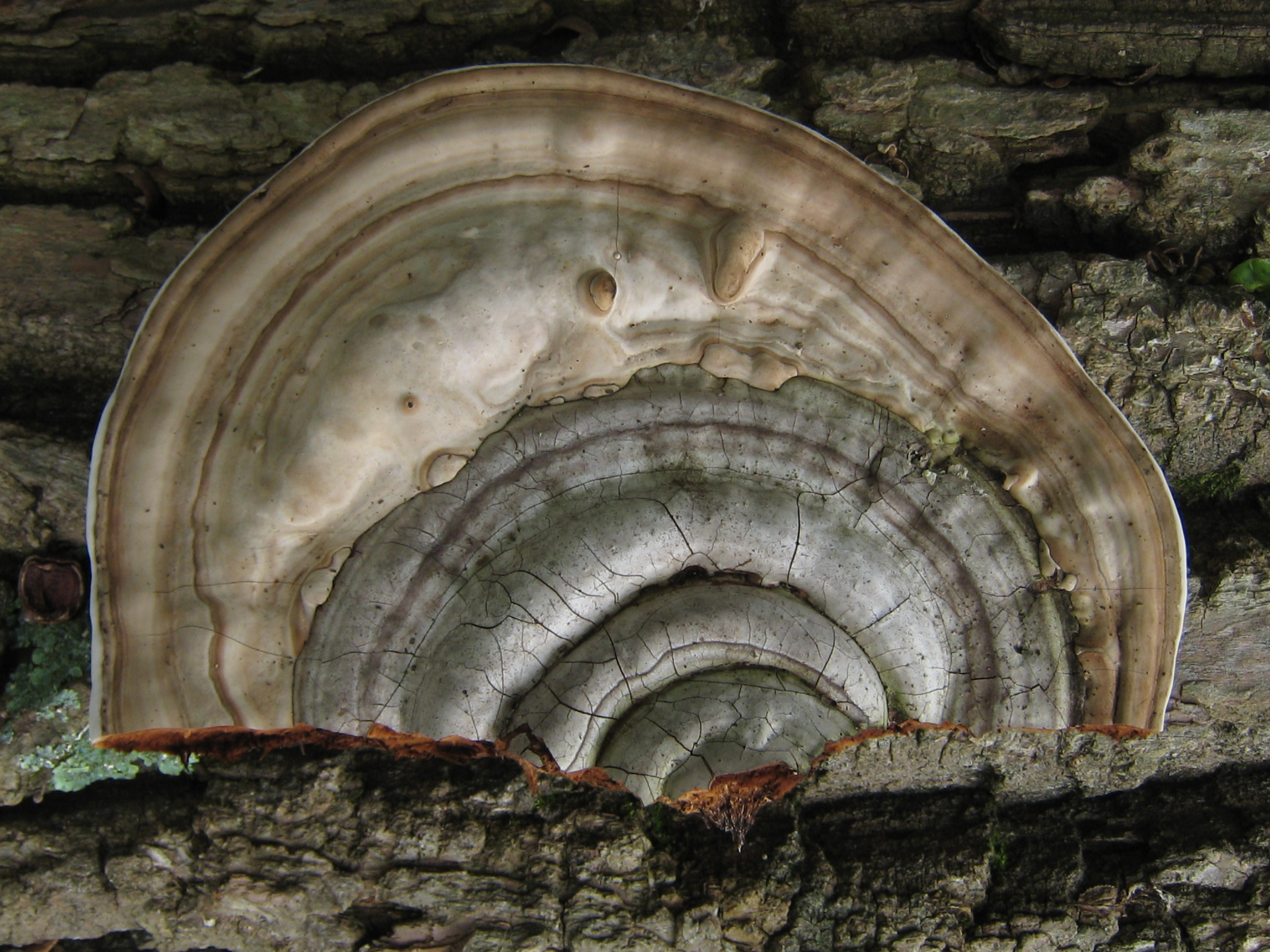
Ganoderma subgenus elfvingia

Ganoderma is a genus of polypore fungi in the family Ganodermataceae that includes about 80 species, many from tropical regions. They may be called shelf mushrooms or bracket fungi and have a high genetic diversity. Ganoderma can be differentiated from other polypores because they have a double-walled basidiospore. They are used in traditional Asian medicine.

== Description ==
Ganoderma are characterized by basidiocarps, which are large, perennial, woody brackets also called "conks". They are lignicolous and leathery either with or without a stem. The fruit bodies typically grow in a fan-like or hoof-like form on the trunks of living or dead trees. They have double-walled, truncate spores with yellow to brown ornamented inner layers.

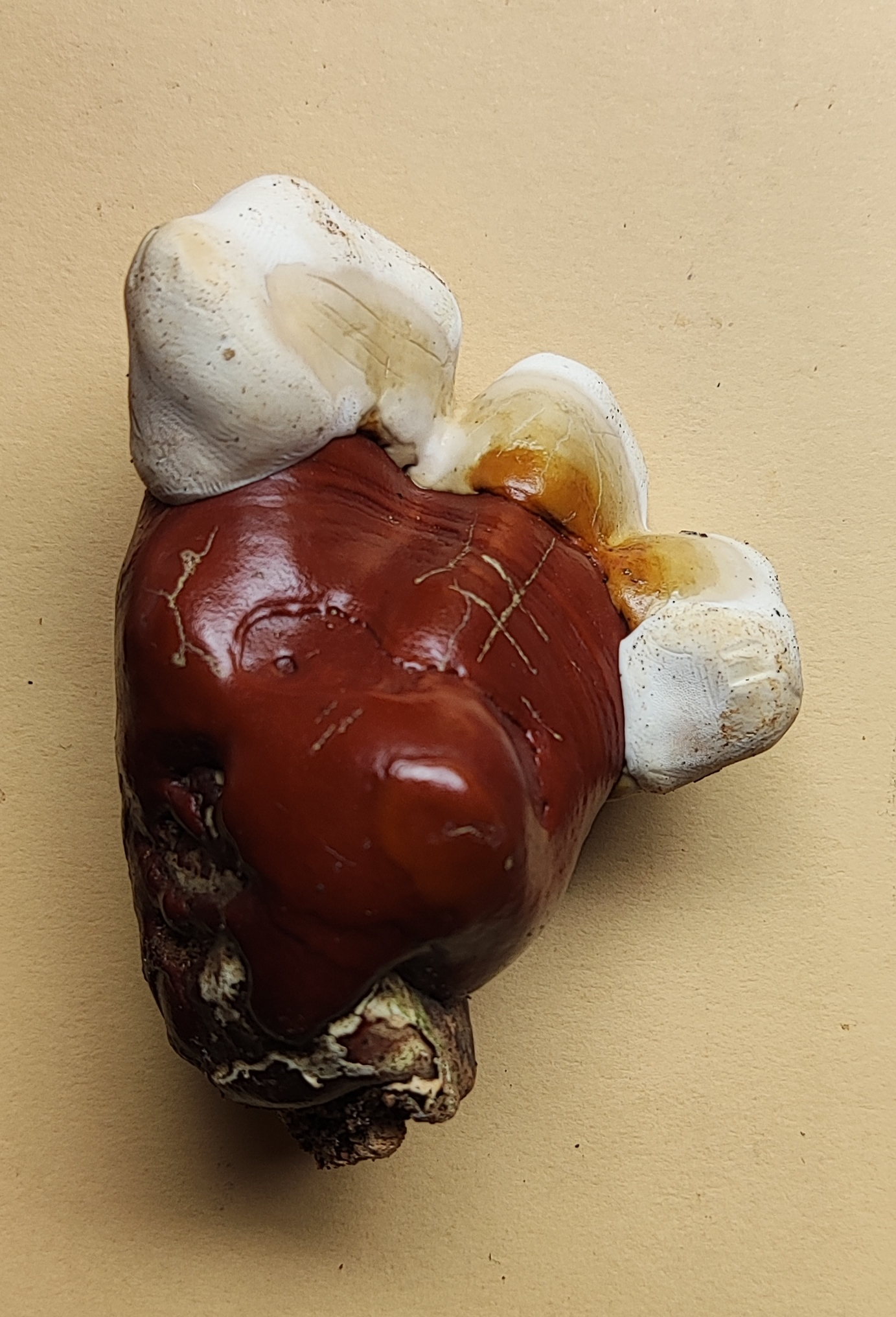
Early growth stage

== Taxonomy ==
=== Taxonomic history ===
The genus Ganoderma was established as a genus in 1881 by Karsten and included only one species, G. lucidum (Curtis) Karst. Previously, this taxon was characterized as Boletus lucidus Curtis (1781) and then Polyporus lucidus (Curtis) Fr. (1821) (Karsten 1881). The species P. lucidus was characterized by having a laccate (shiny or polished) pileus and stipe, and this is a character that Murrill suspected was the reason for Karsten's division because only one species was included, G. lucidum . Patouillard revised Karsten's genus Ganoderma to include all species with pigmented spores, adhering tubes and laccate crusted pilei, which resulted with a total of 48 species classified under the genus Ganoderma in his 1889 monograph. Until Murrill investigated Ganoderma in North America in 1902, previous work had focused solely on European species including, for example, G. lucidum, G. resinaceum Boud. (1890) and G. valesiacum Boud. (1895).

=== Notable species ===
- Ganoderma applanatum - Also known as the artist's conk.
- Ganoderma adspersum - Infestation of this species was the main factor in the loss of the Anne Frank Tree.
- Ganoderma lucidum - A polypore with limited distribution in Europe and parts of China, often misidentified on products labelled reishi or lingzhi that actually contain Ganoderma sichuanense, because of the persistence of outdated naming conventions.
- Ganoderma pfeifferi - Also known as the beeswax bracket.
- Ganoderma sichuanense (=G. lingzhi) - Also known as lingzhi or reishi; used extensively in traditional Asian medicine.
- Ganoderma sinense - Also known as black reishi or zizhi.
- Ganoderma tsugae - A polypore which grows on conifers, especially hemlock, giving it its common name, hemlock varnish shelf. Similar in appearance to Ganoderma lucidum and a close relative, which typically grows on hardwoods.
- Ganoderma microsporum - A polypore found in Taiwan with a very small spore size.

=== Phylogeny ===
The genus was named by Karsten in 1881. Members of the family Ganodermataceae were traditionally considered difficult to classify because of the lack of reliable morphological characteristics, the overabundance of synonyms, and the widespread misuse of names. Until recently, the genus was divided into two sections – Ganoderma, with a shiny cap surface (like Ganoderma lucidum), and Elfvingia, with a dull cap surface (like G. applanatum).

Phylogenetic analysis using DNA sequence information have helped to clarify our understanding of the relationships amongst Ganoderma species. The genus may now be divided into six monophyletic groups:

- G. colossus group
- G. applanatum group
- G. tsugae group
- Asian G. lucidum group
- G. meredithiae group
- G. resinaceum group

With the rise of molecular phylogenies in the late 20th century, species concept hypotheses were tested to determine the relatedness amongst the nuanced morphological variabilities of the laccate Ganoderma taxa. In 1995, Moncalvo et al constructed a phylogeny of the rDNA, which was the universally accepted locus at that time, and found five major clades of the laccate species amongst the 29 isolates tested. It turned out that G. lucidum was not a monophyletic species, and further work needed to be done to clarify this taxonomic problem. They also found that G. resinaceum from Europe, and the North American 'G. lucidum', which Adaskaveg and Gilbertson found to be biologically compatible in vitro, did not cluster together. Moncalvo et al. reject biological species complexes as a sole tool to distinguish a taxon, and suggested using a combination between biological and phylogenetic species concepts to define unique Ganoderma taxa.

In 1905, American mycologist William Murrill delineated the genus Tomophagus to accommodate the single species G. colossus (then known as Polyporus colossus) which had distinctive morphological features that did not fit in with the other species. Historically, however, Tomophagus has generally been regarded as a synonym for Ganoderma. Nearly a century later, phylogenetic analyses vindicated Murrill's original placement, as it has shown to be a taxonomically distinct appropriate genus.

=== Etymology ===
The name Ganoderma is derived from the Greek ganos/γάνος "brightness, sheen", hence "shining" and derma/δέρμα "skin".

== Distribution and ecology ==
Ganoderma are wood-decay fungi with a cosmopolitan distribution, often tropical. They can grow on both coniferous and hardwood species, causing a white rot. Some species can cause major long-term crop losses, especially with trees:

- G. orbiforme (= G. boninense), G. zonatum and G. miniatocinctum are responsible for basal stem rot disease in Asian oil palm plantations.
- G. philippii and G. pseudoferreum are responsible for the root rot of cacao, coffee, rubber and tea trees.

This genus is a favorite food of some pleasing fungus beetles (family Erotylidae). Species recorded from Ganoderma include Dacne quadrimaculata which eats it occasionally, and Megalodacne fasciata which might depend on fungi of this genus to survive.

== Uses ==
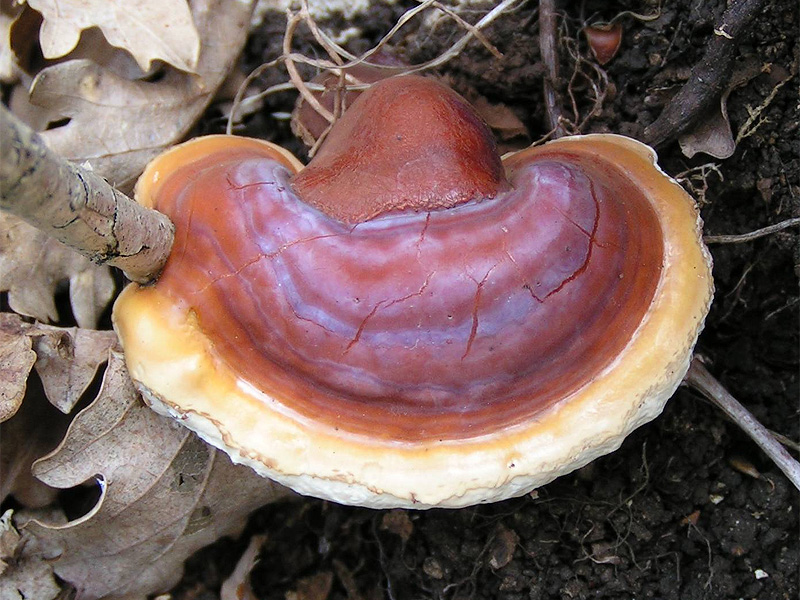
Ganoderma lucidum

For centuries, Ganoderma species have been used in traditional medicine in many parts of Asia. These species are often mislabeled as 'G. lucidum', although genetic testing has shown this to be multiple species such as G. sichuanense (=G. lingzhi), and G. multipileum. There is, however no high-quality evidence that Ganoderma or its phytochemicals are medicinally effective in humans, e.g. for treating cancer.

Several species of Ganoderma contain diverse phytochemicals with undefined properties in vivo, such as triterpenoids and polysaccharides, an area of investigation under basic research.

The species have enzymes that allow them to break down wood components, such as lignin and cellulose. There has been significant research interest on the wood-degrading enzymes of Ganoderma species for industrial applications, such as biopulping and bioremediation.

== See also ==
- Bolitotherus
- Ganoderic acid
