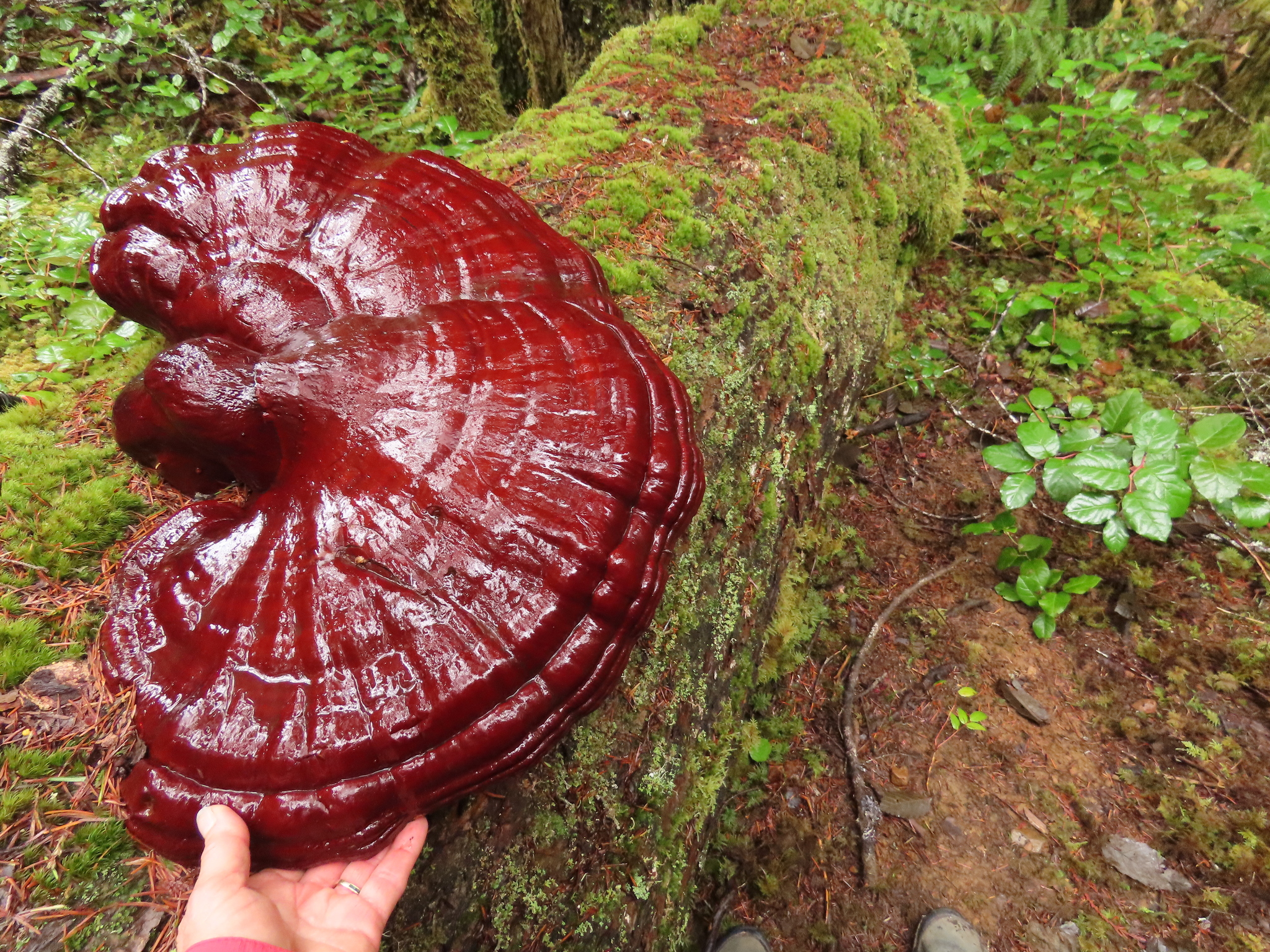
- Jefferson County, Washington, 2023

Scientific classification
- Kingdom: Fungi
- Division: Basidiomycota
- Class: Agaricomycetes
- Order: Polyporales
- Family: Ganodermataceae
- Genus: Ganoderma
- Species: G. oregonense

Binomial name
- Ganoderma oregonense Murrill, 1908

= Ganoderma oregonense =

Species of fungus

Ganoderma oregonense (also known as the west-coast reishi, western varnished conk, lacquer fungus, and American ling-chi) is a species of polypore (bracket fungus) native to the northwestern coastal regions of North America. It is a wood-decay fungus that infects conifers, causing white rot of the root and butt of the infected tree.

== Taxonomy ==
This species was originally described by W. A. Murrill as:

Pileus reniform, corky, rigid, convex above, plane below, 10 x 17 x 5 cm; surface glabrous, thinly encrusted, smooth, laccate, very lustrous, bay to black, with a deep groove near the margin, which is cream-colored, rounded, smooth, entire, finely tomentose; context punky, white to slightly discolored, homogeneous, with white lines of mycelium near the stipe, 2-3.5 cm. thick; tubes annual, 1 cm. long, avellaneous within, mouths circular to angular, 3 to a mm., edges thin, entire, white to avellaneous; stipe lateral, very thick, short, subcylindric, 2-4 cm long, 3-6 cm. thick, expanding into the pileus, which it resembles in color, surface, and context.

== Description ==
Western varnished conk has a shiny brown-red-orange and sometimes cream-colored upper surface (often appearing as a color gradient), and white- or cream-colored pores. It can be shaped like a kidney or a fan or a hoof, or like a plate or stack of plates jammed into the side of a log. It fruits annually (rather than perennially), and usually shows up in the fall. They can grow up to 10–50 centimetres (4–19 1/2 in) wide, sometimes with a stem 2.5–10 cm (1–4 in) long and 0.5–4 cm (1/4–1 1/2 in) thick.

=== Similar species ===
G. oregonense is very similar to Ganoderma tsugae, but G. tsugae is associated with east coast Tsuga (hemlock) rather than west coast conifer. Its been speculated that G. oregonense and G. tsugae might actually be one species. Additionally, G. polychromum usually grows on the ground.

== Distribution and habitat ==
It can be found in northwestern coastal North America, including California, Oregon, Washington, British Columbia, Yukon, and Alaska. It can be found year-round but is freshest from July to November.

Trees inoculated with G. oregonense end up with spongy, soft insides. It prefers dead red fir but will also accept dead or alive Douglas fir, spruce, hemlock, and pine. When this reishi is found on living trees it is usually consequent to tree wounds, such as bear marks.

== Uses ==
According to Paul Stamets, this fungus is edible. This is unusual for a Ganoderma, specimens of which are usually far too tough to be eaten. (Reishi is often dried, powdered and consumed as a mushroom tea.)
