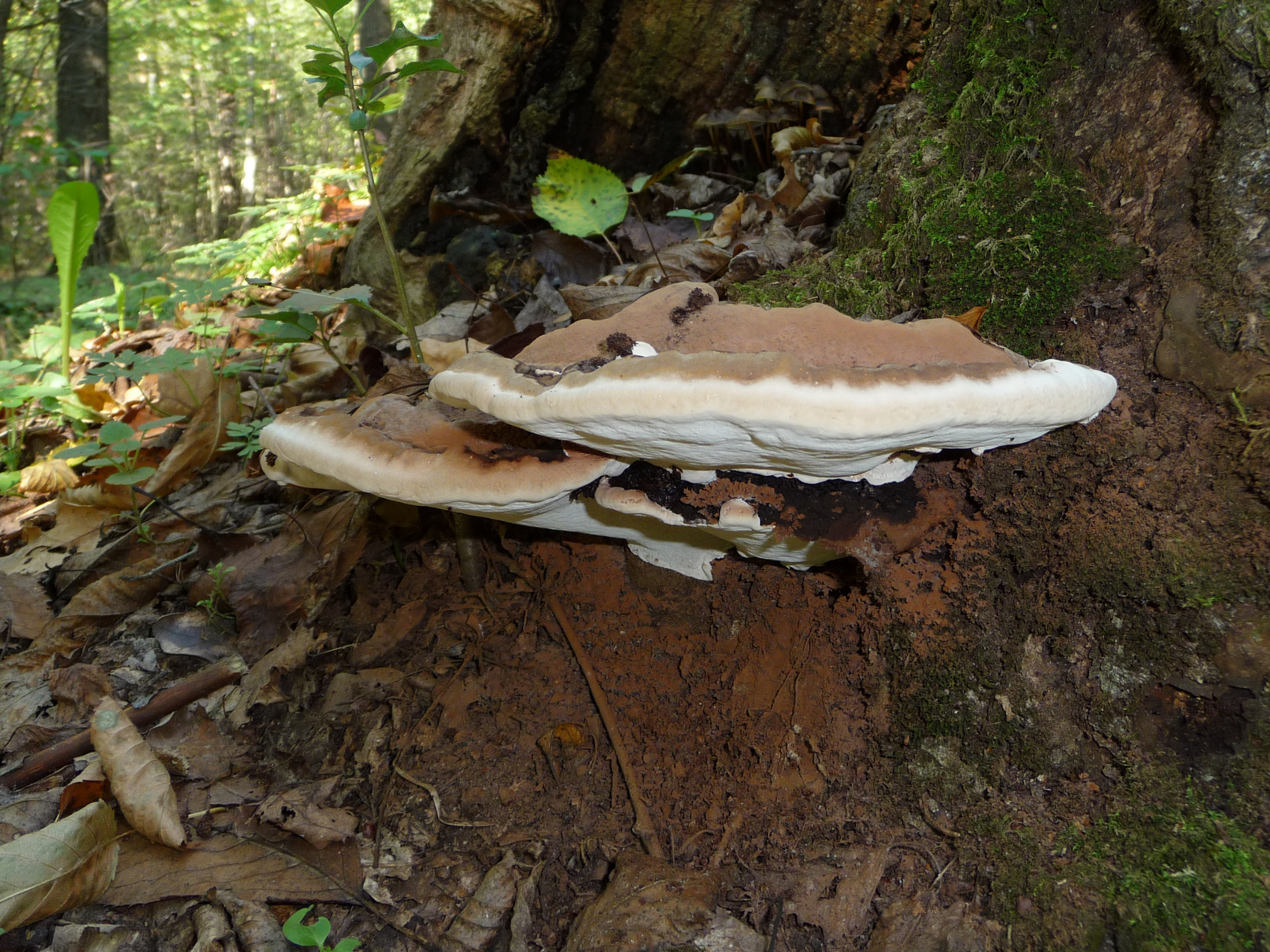

Conservation status
- Secure (NatureServe)

Scientific classification
- Kingdom: Fungi
- Division: Basidiomycota
- Class: Agaricomycetes
- Order: Polyporales
- Family: Ganodermataceae
- Genus: Ganoderma
- Species: G. applanatum

Binomial name
- Ganoderma applanatum (Pers.) Pat.

Synonyms
- Boletus applanatus; Elfvingia applanata; Fomes applanatus; Fomes vegetus; Ganoderme aplani; Ganoderma lipsiense; Polyporus applanatus; Polyporus vegetus

= Ganoderma applanatum =

Artist's bracket

Species of fungus

Ganoderma applanatum
- Mycological characteristics
- Pores on hymenium
- No distinct cap
- Hymenium is decurrent
- Lacks a stipe
- Spore print is brown
- Ecology is parasitic
- Edibility is inedible

Ganoderma applanatum (the artist's bracket, artist's conk, artist's fungus or bear bread) is a bracket fungus with a cosmopolitan distribution. As its common names suggest, it can be used as a drawing medium.

== Description ==
Ganoderma applanatum is parasitic and saprophytic, and grows as a mycelium within the wood of living and dead trees. It grows in single, scattered, or compound formations. It forms fruiting bodies that are 3–30 centimetres (1–12 inches) wide, 5–50 cm (2–19 1/2 in) long and 1–10 cm (1/2–4 in) thick; exceptionally it may grow up to 75 centimetres (30 in) across. It is hard as leather and woody-textured. The upper surface of the fruiting body appears brown, covered with reddish-brown. The underside is white but stains brown.

The fruiting bodies are perennial, and may persist for multiple years, increasing in size and forming new layers of pores as they grow. These layers can be distinguished in a cross section or from observation of the concentric rings on the upper surface of the fruiting body. This allows the fruiting body's age to be determined using the same method as tree rings.

Brown spores are released from the pores on the underside of the fruiting body. The spores are highly concentrated, and as many as 4.65 billion spores can be dispersed from a 10 cm (4 in) by 10 cm section of the conk within 24 hours. The tubes are 4–12 millimetres (1/8–1/2 in) deep and terminate in pores that are round with 4–6 per millimetre. The spore print is reddish brown.

=== Similar species ===
The similar Ganoderma brownii has thicker, darker flesh, often a yellow pore surface, and larger spores than G. applanatum. G. oregonense, G. lucidum, and Fomitopsis pinicola are also similar. Fomes fasciatus produces a white spore print.

== Ecology ==
G. applanatum is a wood-decay fungus, causing a rot of heartwood in a variety of trees. It can also grow as a pathogen of live sapwood, particularly on older trees that are sufficiently wet. It is a common cause of decay and death of beech and poplar, and less often of several other tree genera, including alder, apple, elm, buckeye and horse chestnut, maple, oak, live oak, walnut, willow, western hemlock, Douglas fir, old or sick olive tree, and spruce. G. applanatum grows more often on dead trees than living ones.

There are anecdotal references of higher primates consuming this fungus for self-medication. In her book Gorillas in the Mist (1983), Dian Fossey wrote:

Still another special food (for the gorillas) is bracket fungus (Ganoderma applanatum)... The shelflike projection is difficult to break free, so younger animals often have to wrap their arms and legs awkwardly around a trunk and content themselves by only gnawing at the delicacy. Older animals who succeed in breaking the fungus loose have been observed carrying it several hundred feet from its source, all the while guarding it possessively from more dominant individuals' attempts to take it away. Both the scarcity of the fungus and the gorillas' liking of it cause many intragroup squabbles, a number of which are settled by the silverback, who simply takes the item of contention for himself.

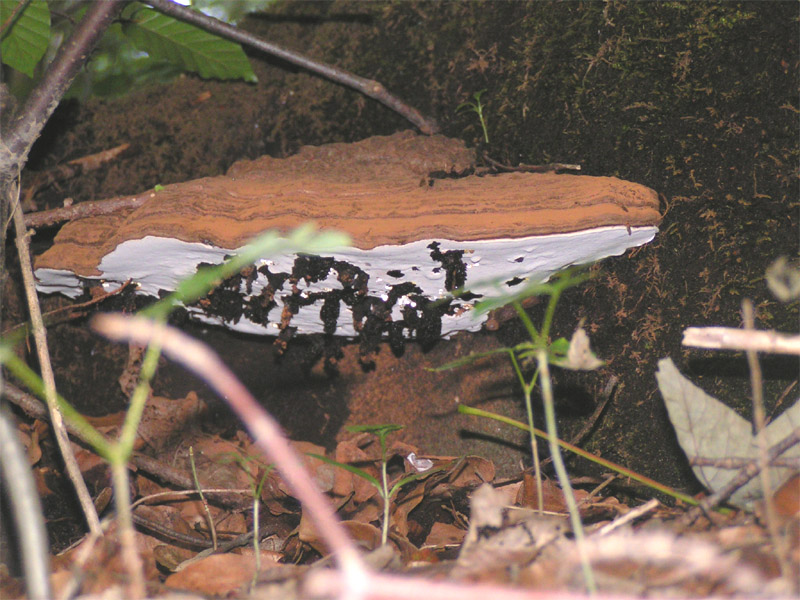
Larval galls (black objects) of Agathomyia wankowiczii on an artist's bracket fungus

The midge Agathomyia wankowiczii lays its eggs on the fruiting body of the fungus, forming galls. The fly Hirtodrosophila mycetophaga courts and mates entirely on light-colored undersides of bracket fungi such as G.applanatum, but chooses darker fruiting bodies which are close to decaying to lay its eggs.

Forked fungus beetles (Bolitotherus cornutus) lay their eggs on the surface of the fruiting bodies and the larvae live inside of the fruiting bodies of G. applanatum and a few other bracket fungi. Also, adults of the pleasing fungus beetle Aporotritoma pulchra have been recorded from this fungus, but it does not seem to be a regular food source for them.

== Uses ==
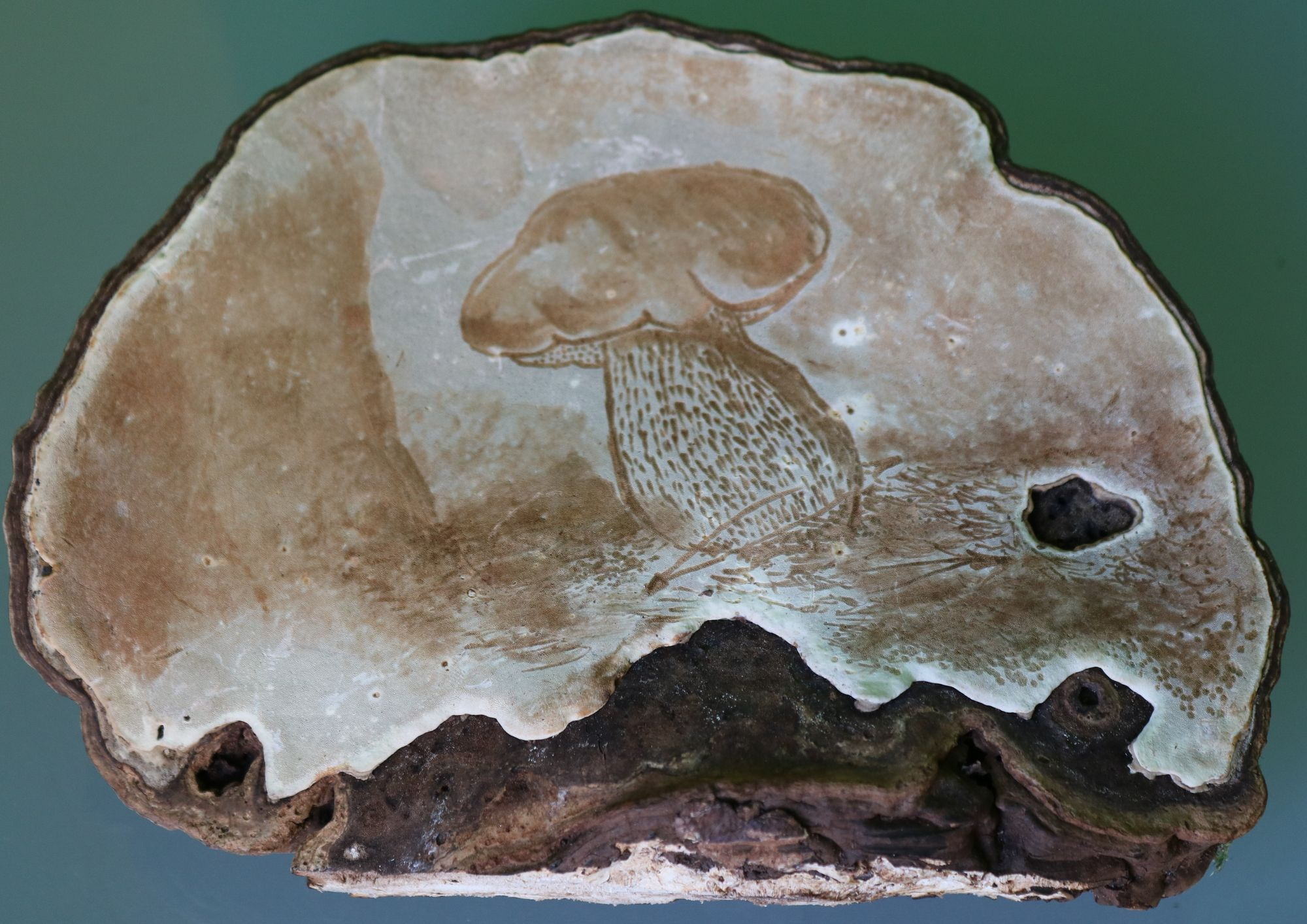
A drawing on the lower side of the sporocarp of G. applanatum

A peculiarity of this fungus lies in its use as a drawing medium for artists. When the fresh white pore surface is rubbed or scratched with a sharp implement, dark brown tissue under the pores is revealed, resulting in visible lines and shading that become permanent once the fungus is dried. This practice is what gives G. applanatum its common name.

G. applanatum is a medicinal farming crop that is used as a flavor enhancer in Asian cuisine. G. applanatum is non-digestible in its raw form due to its toughness. Hot herbal soups, or fermentation in lemon acid with onion is a common use for cooking with G. applanatum slices as an umami flavor enhancer in fermented foods. G. applanatum can also be used in tea.

G. applanatum has been used to produce amadou, although Fomes fomentarius is most commonly associated with its production. Amadou is a leathery, easily flammable material that is produced from different polypores, but can also be consist of similar material. Amadou generally has three areas of use: fire making, medicinal, and clothing, however, it is mostly associated with fire making.

=== Medicinal uses ===
Medicinal uses of G. applanatum have been extensive over thousands of years. In Chinese medicine, the fungus has been used to treat rheumatic tuberculosis and esophageal carcinoma. It has also been used more commonly to resolve indigestion, relieve pain and reduce phlegm. Further studies have shown that its medicinal qualities also include anti-tumor, anti-oxidation and as a regulator for body immunity.

G. applanatum is known in Japan as kofuki-saru-no-koshikake (コフキサルノコシカケ), literally meaning "powder-covered monkey's bench", and in China as shu-she-ling-zhi (树舌灵芝), where it has long been used in traditional medicines. Studies have shown G. applanatum contains compounds with potent anti-tumor, antibacterial anti-fibrotic properties.

G. applanatum is generally studied from three angles: medicinal, phytopathological, and biotechnological. Medicinal fungi such as G. applanatum are of special interest due to their antibiotic properties. Methanol extracts from G. applanatum have shown that the fatty acids present, such as palmitic acid, show antibacterial properties. Compared to synthetic antibiotics these compounds extracted from G. applanatum lack problems of drug resistance and side effects.

== See also ==
- Forest pathology
