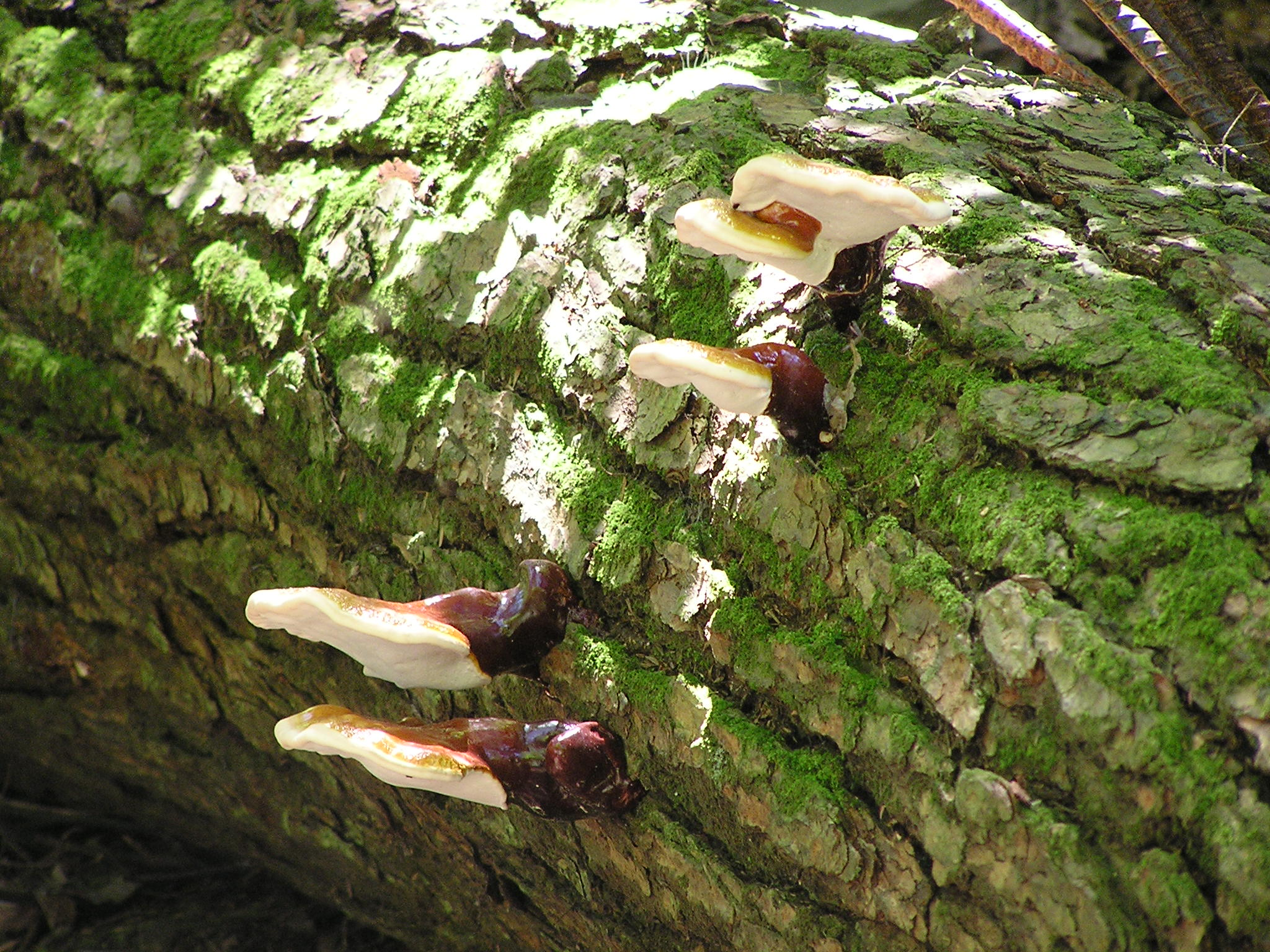

Scientific classification
- Kingdom: Fungi
- Division: Basidiomycota
- Class: Agaricomycetes
- Order: Polyporales
- Family: Ganodermataceae
- Genus: Ganoderma
- Species: G. tsugae

Binomial name
- Ganoderma tsugae Murrill

= Ganoderma tsugae =

Species of fungus

Ganoderma tsugae
- Mycological characteristics
- Pores on hymenium
- Cap is flat
- Hymenium is adnate
- Stipe is bare
- Spore print is brown
- Ecology is saprotrophic or parasitic
- Edibility is too hard to eat

Ganoderma tsugae, also known as hemlock varnish shelf, is a flat polypore mushroom of the genus Ganoderma.

== Habitat ==
In contrast to Ganoderma lucidum, to which it is closely related and which it closely resembles, G. tsugae tends to grow on conifers, especially hemlocks.

== Uses ==
Like G. lucidum, G. tsugae is non-poisonous but generally considered inedible, because of its solid woody nature; however, teas and extracts made from its fruiting bodies supposedly allow medicinal use of the compounds it contains, although this is controversial within the scientific community. A hot water extraction or tea can be very effective for extracting the polysaccharides; however, an alcohol or alcohol/glycerin extraction method is more effective for the triterpenoids.

The fresh, soft growth of the "lip" of G. tsugae can be sautéed and prepared much like other edible mushrooms. While in this nascent stage it is not woody, it can still be tough and chewy.

=== Medicinal ===
Like G. lucidum, G. tsugae is purported to have medicinal properties including use for dressing a skin wound. Though phylogenetic analysis has begun to better differentiate between many closely related species of Ganoderma; there is still disagreement as to which have the most medicinal properties. Natural and artificial variations (e.g. growing conditions and preparation) may also affect any medicinal value.

Studies in mice have shown that G. tsugae shows several potential medicinal benefits including anti-tumor activity through some of the active polysaccharides found in G. tsugae. G. tsugae has also been shown to significantly promote wound healing in mice as well as markedly increase the proliferation and migration of fibroblast cells in culture.
