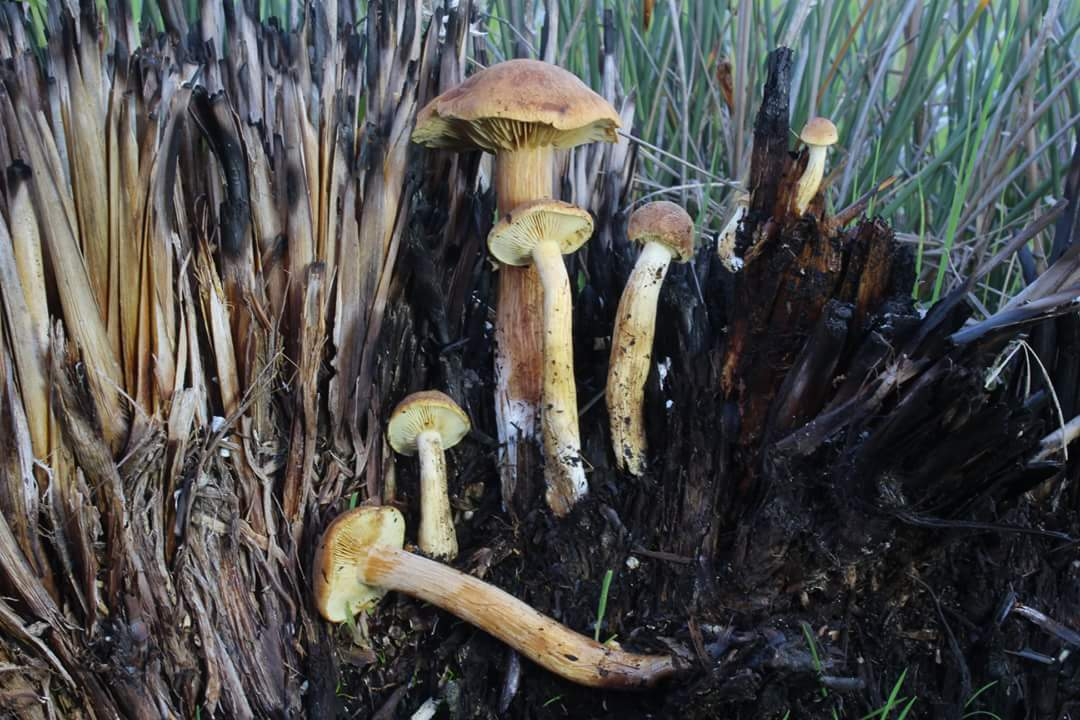

Scientific classification
- Kingdom: Fungi
- Division: Basidiomycota
- Class: Agaricomycetes
- Order: Agaricales
- Family: Hymenogastraceae
- Genus: Gymnopilus
- Species: G. maritimus

Binomial name
- Gymnopilus maritimus Contu, Guzm.-Dáv., Ortega & Vizzini
- Gymnopilus maritimus is known only from a localised area in the Province of Olbia-Tempio, Sardinia, Italy.

= Gymnopilus maritimus =

Species of fungus

Gymnopilus maritimus is a fungus species of the family Hymenogastraceae first collected in northern Sardinia, Italy, in 2006. The species produces moderately sized, sturdy mushrooms of a reddish-orange colour. The cap, which can measure up to 70 millimetres (3 in) across, is covered in orange fibrils, and sometimes has small scales. The yellowish stem measures up to 110 mm (4 in) in length by 8 mm (0.3 in) in width, and sometimes shows remnants of the partial veil. The mushrooms have thick gills of a variable colour, ranging from yellow to rust but staining darker, and the yellow flesh has a mild taste. The mushrooms leave a rusty-brown spore print, while the spores themselves measure from 7.5–11.5 micrometres (0.00030–0.00045 in) in length. The species is most similar in appearance to G. arenophilus and G. fulgens, but can be differentiated from both morphologically. Despite the similarities, it is not closely related to either, suggesting convergent evolution. Instead, within the genus Gymnopilus, it is most closely related to the spectabilis–imperialis clade. However, it is not particularly similar to any of its closest relatives.

The species has been found only on coastal sand dunes near Olbia, in Sardinia, where it was observed growing at the base of Juncus maritimus (the sea rush), between the winter months of October and January. However, there is speculation that it may also grow elsewhere in Europe. Mushrooms were seen growing from both the sandy soil and decaying plants; however, as a saprotrophic feeder, it is possible that the species would be able to grow on other substrates. The mushrooms grow in close groups or tight tufts.

== Taxonomy ==
- - - - Gymnopilus underwoodii
      - Gymnopilus validipes
    - Gymnopilus flavus
  - - - Gymnopilus imperialis
      - Gymnopilus spectabilis
    - Gymnopilus maritimus

Cladogram showing the phylogeny of G. maritimus and some related species based on molecular analysis of sequences from ITS rDNA.

Gymnopilus maritimus was first described by mycologists Laura Guzmán-Dávalos (a specialist in Gymnopilus), Antonio Ortega, Marco Contu and Alfredo Vizzini in 2009 in an article in the journal Mycological Progress. The description was based on several specimens collected during field work by Contu in Sardinia between January 2006 and January 2007; the holotype was collected on 15 January 2006. The discovery has contributed to Sardinia's reputation as an area of mycological significance. The description was later published in Italian by Contu and Vizzini in the journal Micologia e Vegetazione Mediterranea, along with the description of G. purpuresquamulosus, because the original descriptions of both of these species were in English, and difficult for non-specialists to obtain. The specific epithet maritimus refers to the typical habitat of coastal sand dunes, on sandy soil or decomposing Juncus maritimus. The holotype has been deposited in the University of Granada's herbarium.

Within the genus Gymnopilus, it is located in the subgenus Gymnopilus and section Macrospori. The subgenus Gymnopilus was proposed by Henri Romagnesi as Cortinatae (while the genus was known as Fulvidula) in 1942, though the name Gymnopilus was given later by Rolf Singer. The subgenus is characterised by mushrooms that feature either no veils, or veils that do not form rings. The section Macrospori, proposed by Guzmán-Dávalos in 1995, is made up of large-spored species with ringless mushrooms. Molecular analysis revealed that G. maritimus forms a sister group to (that is, shares an immediate common ancestor with) the spectabilis–imperialis clade, a clade that includes G. imperialis, G. spectabilis, G. junonius (often considered synonymous with G. spectabilis), G. pampeanus, and others. G. maritimus forms a more inclusive clade along with the members of spectabilis–imperialis; while it produces the smallest fruit bodies, it shares with the other members strong, sturdy mushrooms, caps with fibrils (sometimes with scales) and large, warty spores that turn red in Melzer's reagent or Lugol's iodine.

== Description ==
External image
- A photograph of Gymnopilus maritimus mushrooms, taken of the holotype and published with the original description. Hosted by Springer.

Gymnopilus maritimus Mycological characteristics
- Gills on hymenium
- Cap is convex
- Hymenium is adnate or sinuate
- Stipe is bare
- Spore print is reddish-brown
- Ecology is saprotrophic
- Edibility is unknown

Gymnopilus maritimus mushrooms have a cap of between 15 and 70 millimetres (0.6 and 3 in) in width that is convex to flattened-convex in shape. There is sometimes a broad umbo, and in older specimens, the cap is depressed in the centre. The margin of the cap is somewhat wavey. The cap surface is dry and dull, coloured red to red-orange, and yellow towards the margin. It is covered in fibrils of an orange colour, and sometimes has minute scales. The dried cap turns blackish-red when potassium hydroxide is applied. The stem is 35 to 110 mm (1 to 4 in) in length by 4 to 8 mm (0.2 to 0.3 in) in width. It is attached centrally to the cap, and is either completely cylindrical, with equal thickness throughout its length, or slightly narrower towards the base, where whitish or cream mycelia are sometimes visible. It is dry, with fibres and furrows. It is a yellowish colour, bruising reddish brown. Traces of the partial veil are sometimes visible on the stem, though it does not form a ring. The yellow (brown at the bottom of the stem) flesh can be up to 15 mm (0.6 in) thick in the cap and does not bruise. It dries dark brown. There is no distinctive odour, and the taste is mild or slightly bitter. The thick gills can be adnate (connected to the stem by the entire depth of the gill) or sinuate (wavy, with the gills becoming shallower than deeper). They are subdistant (neither close nor distant) and swollen in the middle. In colour, they are yellow in the youngest mushrooms, turning an ochre-orange, while the oldest mushrooms they are rust. The gill edges are paler than the faces, and the gills stain orange-brown or darker. No reference is made in the original description to the edibility of the mushrooms.

=== Microscopic characteristics ===
Gymnopilus maritimus leaves a rusty-brown spore print. The basidiospores can measure 7.5–11.5 micrometres (0.00030–0.00045 in) in length, though the typical range is 8–10.5 micrometres (0.00031–0.00041 in). In width, they typically measure 5.5–7.5 micrometres (0.00022–0.00030 in), but they can be up to 8 μm wide. In shape, they are ellipsoid or sometimes broadly ellipsoid. The top of the spore (the side where it was once attached to the sterigma, the connection between the basidium and the spore) is rounded and blunt. The spores are covered with fairly large warts, measuring from 0.5–2 micrometres (2.0×10^{−5}–7.9×10^{−5} in) from the main spore in height. There is no germ pore or plage, and there is no clear depression around the hilum (the area where the spore was attached to the sterigma). The spores turn an orange-yellow to orange-brown colour in potassium hydroxide, and turn reddish-brown in Melzer's reagent and in Lugol's iodine, but they are not metachromatic.

The four-spored basidia typically measure 24–35 micrometres (0.00094–0.00138 in) in length by 7–9 micrometres (0.00028–0.00035 in) in width, but can be as much as 10.5 μm wide. They are club-shaped, but narrower in the middle. They are hyaline (translucent) and yellow to yellowish brown. The sterigmata are between 1.6 and 7 μm long. The cheilocystidia (cystidia on the edge of the gill) are typically 30 to 42 (though sometimes as much as 50) μm long by 6–10.5 micrometres (0.00024–0.00041 in) wide. They are shaped like a flask or wine-skin. The top of the cell suddenly widens, and the cell as a whole is thin-walled, hyaline and yellowish, and sometimes appears to contain small grains. The caulocystidia (cystidia on the stem) can be found in tufts at the top of the stem, and measure from 24–60 micrometres (0.00094–0.00236 in) by 3–9 micrometres (0.00012–0.00035 in). They are cylindrical, or narrowly flask-shaped, sometimes with a long neck. They are, again, yellow and hyaline.

The yellowish hyphae are between 15 and 13.5 μm wide with a wall of variable thickness. There are clamp connections at the septa (the walls dividing individual hypha cells). The flesh in the cap is radial, and is made up of yellowish hyphae of between 2.4 and 20 μm wide. The pileipellis, the outermost layer of hyphae, forms a cutis, and on older specimens (and on the small scales) forms a trichoderm.

=== Similar species ===
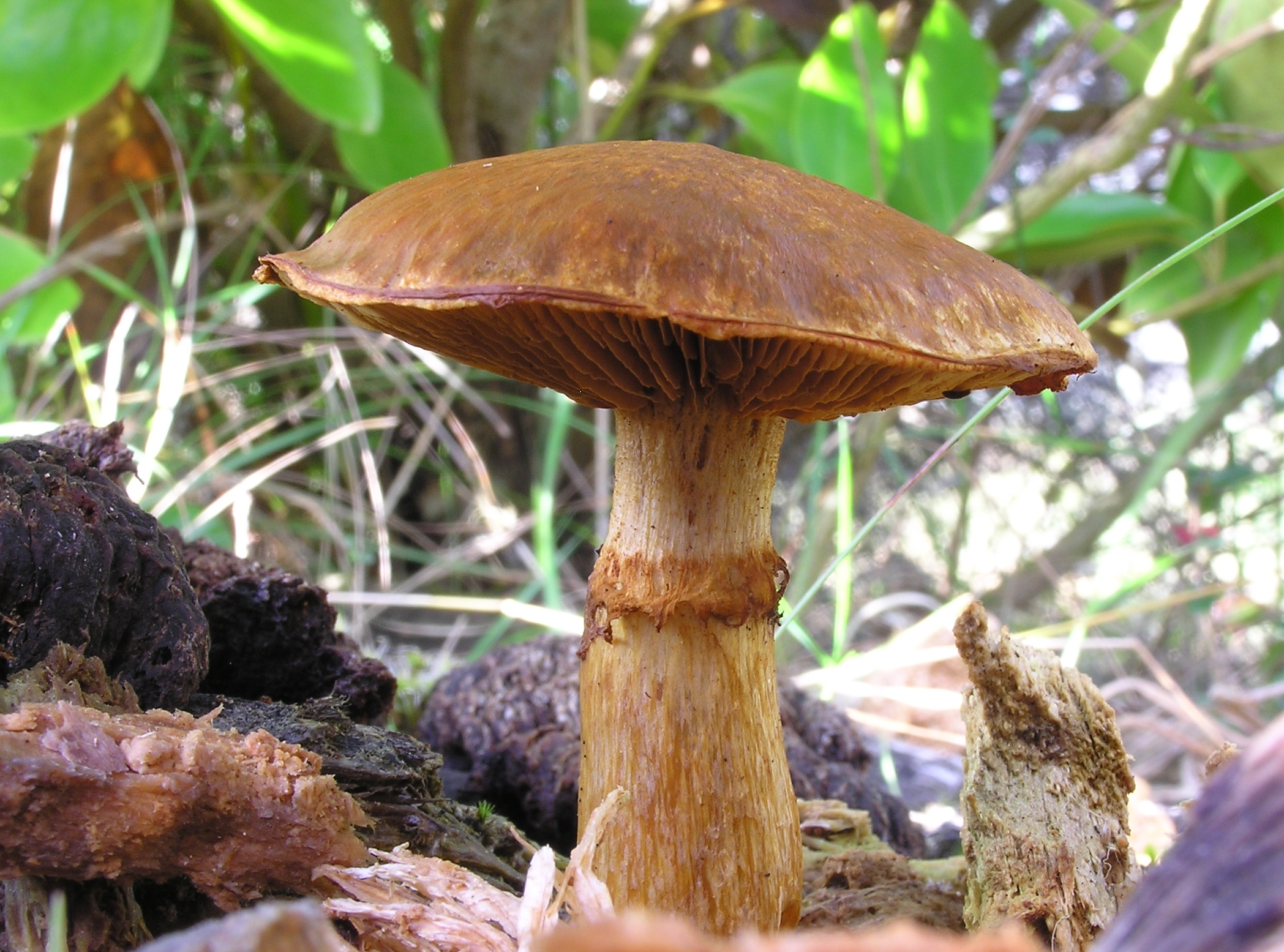
Although closely related, G. junonius (pictured) is different from G. maritimus in a number of ways, including the presence of a well-developed ring.

There are five species similar in appearance to G. maritimus: G. arenophilus, G. decipiens, G. flavus, G. fulgens and G. pseudofulgens. G. arenophilus and particularly G. fulgens are the most similar. Though G. maritimus and G. arenophilus show similarities in their biogeography and ecology, the typically slightly smaller G. arenophilus differs from G. maritimus morphologically. While G. maritimus has a cap covered in fibrils with small scales, G. arenophilus can sometimes be completely smooth, and spore ornamentation differs, with G. maritimus typically displaying larger warts. Like G. maritimus, G. fulgens has been recorded growing on sand-dune heathland; further, the spores are similar in appearance to those of G. maritimus. However, G. fulgens requires soil rich in peat and must grow among moss. Moreover, there are a number of morphological differences; G. maritimus mushrooms are larger and thicker, there are never remains of the partial veil on G. fulgens stems, the shape of the top of the spores differs between the two species, and the cheilocystidia and caulocystidia are significantly larger on G. maritimus. G. fulgens var. luteicystis is even more distinct from G. maritimus than the nominate variety. Despite the similarities between the three species, the three have been shown to be in different clades within Gymnopilus, suggesting ecological convergence between G. arenophilus and G. maritimus, and morphological convergence between G. fulgens and G. maritimus.

Gymnopilus flavus, despite also appearing on land near the Mediterranean, can be differentiated from G. maritimus as it lives among grass, especially Dactylis glomerata, and it has distinctly smaller spores, typically measuring 5 to 6 by 3.5 to 4.2 μm. G. pseudofulgens, also collected in Italy, shows two major morphological differences: it produces smaller mushrooms, and spores that are of a different shape with smaller warts. G. decipiens, another species that grows on sandy soil, again has spores that are markedly different. The American species G. arenicola also favours sandy soil, but has significantly smaller spores than G. maritimus. Two other species of Gymnopilus found around the Mediterranean are G. corsicus and G. spadiceus. G. corsicus has no veil remnants on the stem, and spores that do not turn red in Melzer's reagent or Lugol's iodine, and so can easily be differentiated from G. maritimus. G. spadiceus shows several similarities to G. maritimus, but grows only on pine wood and has rectangular spores.

Gymnopils maritimus is clearly a different species from other members of its clade, despite their close relation. All other species in the clade grow upon dead wood and have well-developed rings on their stems. The spores also differ; in the case of G. junonius and G. spectabilis (often considered synonymous), as well as G. pampeanus, they are narrower, and in the case of G. imperialis, they are wider. Of the other members of the clade, only G. junonius and G. spectabilis also grow in Europe.

== Habitat and distribution ==
Gymnopilus maritimus is known only from a single site in Pittulongu, an area of Olbia, in Sardinia, Italy, which is the type locality. There, mushrooms were found growing in close groups and tufts on coastal sand dunes around 10 metres (33 ft) from the high tide line. They were observed at the base of live Juncus maritimus (sea rush) plants, growing on sandy soil or decaying plants, where they were feeding as saprotrophs. As such, it is possible that the species would be able to grow on other substrates. They were observed growing from autumn to winter, between the end of October and January. In addition to the collections in Sardinia, Contu and Vizzini speculate that reports of G. fulgens growing in "sand-dune heaths" on Great Britain, an unusual habitat for that species, may in fact show the presence of G. maritimus on the island.

== See also ==
- List of Gymnopilus species
