= List of fungi of South Africa – F =

This is an alphabetical list of fungal taxa as recorded from South Africa. Currently accepted names have been appended.

== Fa ==
Genus: Fabraea Sacc. 1881 accepted? as Leptotrochila P. Karst., (1871)

- Fabraea litigiosa Sacc. (sic) possibly (Roberge ex Desm.) Gillet 1886
- Fabraea maculata (Lév.) G.F. Atk. 1951 accepted as Diplocarpon mespili (Sorauer) B. Sutton, 1980)

Genus: Farysia Racib. 1909

- Farysia olivacea (DC.) Syd. & P. Syd. 1920 accepted as Farysia thuemenii (A.A. Fisch. Waldh.) Nannf., (1959)

Genus: Favolus Fr., (1828)

- Favolus agariceus (Berk.) Lév. 1844 accepted as Lentinus arcularius (Batsch) Zmitr., (2010)
- Favolus brasiliensis (Fr.) Fr. 1830 accepted as Favolus tenuiculus P. Beauv., (1806)
- Favolus dermoporus Torrend ex Lloyd.(sic) possibly (Pers.) Lév. 1846 accepted as Favolus tenuiculus P. Beauv., (1806)
- Favolus europaeus Fr. 1838
- Favolus friesii Berk. & M.A. Curtis 1868
- Favolus jacobaeus Sacc. & Berl. 1889
- Favolus megaloporus Bres. 1912
- Favolus moluccensis Mont. 1843 accepted as Royoporus spatulatus (Jungh.) A.B. De [as 'spathulatus'], (1996)
- Favolus multiplex Lév. 1844, [as 'multiple'] accepted as Favolus grammocephalus (Berk.) Imazeki, (1943)
- Favolus natalensis Fr. 1848
- Favolus rhipidium (Berk.) Sacc. 1888 accepted as Panellus pusillus (Pers. ex Lév.) Burds. & O.K. Mill., (1975)
- Favolus spathulatus Bres. (sic) possibly Favolus spatulatus (Jungh.) Lév. [as spathulatus], (1844) accepted as Royoporus spatulatus (Jungh.) A.B. De [as spathulatus], (1996)
- Favolus tenuiculus P. Beauv., (1806) reported as Favolus brasiliensis (Fr.) Fr. 1830, Favolus tessellatus Mont. (1843) [as tesselatus] and possibly Favolus dermoporus Torrend ex Lloyd.(sic)
- Favolus tessellatus Mont. (1843) [as tesselatus] accepted as Favolus tenuiculus P. Beauv., (1806)

Genus: Favotrichophyton (Castell. & Chalm.) Neveu-Lem. 1921 accepted as Trichophyton Malmsten, (1848)

- Favotrichophyton violaceum (Sabour. ex E. Bodin) C.W. Dodge 1935 accepted as Trichophyton violaceum Sabour. ex E. Bodin, (1902)

== Fe ==
Genus: Femsjonia Fr. 1849 accepted as Ditiola Fr., (1822)

- Femsjonia natalensis Cooke 1882;

Genus: Ferrarisia Sacc. 1919

- Ferrarisia jasmini Doidge 1942 accepted as Palawaniella jasmini (Doidge) Arx & E. Müll., (1975)

== Fi ==
Family: Fistuliniodeae*

Genus: Fistulina Bull. 1791

- Fistulina africana Van der Byl 1928

== Fl ==
Genus: Flammula (Fr.) P. Kumm. 1871

- Flammula alnicola Quel. {sic} poaaibly (Fr.) P. Kumm. 1871
- Flammula flavida Quel. (sic) possibly (Schaeff.) P. Kumm. 1871 accepted as Pholiota flavida (Schaeff.) Singer, [1949]
- Flammula harmoge Karst. (sic) possibly (Fr.) Sacc. 1887
- Flammula hybrida Gillet 1876, accepted as Gymnopilus hybridus (Gillet) Maire, (1933)
- Flammula janus (Berk. & Broome) Sacc. 1887
- Flammula sapinea Quel. (sic) possibly (Fr.) P. Kumm. 1871 accepted as Gymnopilus sapineus (Fr.) Murrill, (1912)
- Flammula tilopus (Kalchbr. & MacOwan) Sacc. 1887 accepted as Pholiota tilopus (Kalchbr. & MacOwan) D.A. Reid, (1975)

== Fo ==
Genus: Fomes (Fr.) Fr. 1849

- Fomes albomarginatus (Zipp. ex Lév.) Cooke 1885, accepted as Skeletocutis albomarginata (Zipp. ex Lév.) Rui Du & Y.C. Dai, (2020)
- Fomes annosus (Fr.) Cooke 1885 accepted as Heterobasidion annosum (Fr.) Bref., (1888)
- Fomes annularis Lloyd 1912 accepted as Ganoderma australe (Fr.) Pat., (1889)
- Fomes applanatus Karst (sic) possibly (Pers.) Fr. 1849 accepted as Ganoderma applanatum (Pers.) Pat., (1887)
- Fomes australis (Fr.) Cooke 1885 accepted as Ganoderma australe (Fr.) Pat., (1889)
- Fomes badius Cooke 1885 accepted as Phellinus badius (Cooke) G. Cunn., (1965)
- Fomes caryophylli (Racib.) Bres. 1912, accepted as Phellinus caryophylli (Racib.) G. Cunn., (1965)
- Fomes chilensis Cooke. (sic) possibly (Fr.) Sacc. 1888, accepted as Ganoderma chilense (Fr.) Pat., (1889)
- Fomes conchatus (Pers.) Gillet 1878, accepted as Phellinopsis conchata (Pers.) Y.C. Dai, (2010)
- Fomes connatus (Weinm.) Gillet 1878 accepted as Oxyporus populinus (Schumach.) Donk, (1933)
- Fomes curtisii (Berk.) Cooke 1885, accepted as Ganoderma curtisii (Berk.) Murrill, (1908)
- Fomes dialeri Bres. & Torrend [as 'dialerii'],(1905) accepted as Phellinus rimosus (Berk.) Pilát, (1940)
- Fomes durissimus Lloyd 1920 accepted as Fulvifomes durissimus (Lloyd) Bondartseva & S. Herrera, (1992)
- Fomes endotheius Cooke (sic) possibly (Berk.) Sacc. 1888
- Fomes fastuosus (Lév.) Cooke 1885 accepted as Phellinus fastuosus (Lév.) S. Ahmad, (1972)
- Fomes focalis Cooke (sic) possibly (Kalchbr.) Sacc. 1888
- Fomes fomentarius Kockx (sic) possibly (L.) Fr. 1849,
- Fomes fulvus (Scop.) Gillet 1878
- Fomes fusco-purpureus Boud.(sic) possibly Fomes fuscopurpureus Cooke [as fusco-purpureus], (1885)
- Fomes geotropus (Cooke) Cooke 1885 accepted as Rigidoporus ulmarius (Sowerby) Imazeki, (1952)
- Fomes glaucoporus Lloyd 1915 accepted as Perenniporia inflexibilis (Berk.) Ryvarden, (1972)
- Fomes hemileucus(Berk. & M.A. Curtis) Sacc. 1885 accepted as Fomitella supina (Sw.) Murrill, (1905)
- Fomes hornodermus (Mont.) Cooke 1885, accepted as Perenniporia martia (Berk.) Ryvarden (1972)
- Fomes igniarius Kickx (sic) possibly (L.) Fr. 1849 accepted as Phellinus igniarius (L.) Quél., (1886)
- Fomes kermes Cooke (sic) possibly (Berk. & Broome) Sacc. 1888
- Fomes leucophaeus (Mont.) Cooke 1885 accepted as Ganoderma applanatum (Pers.) Pat., (1887)
- Fomes lividus Cooke (sic)possibly (Kalchbr.) Sacc. 1888, accepted as Truncospora livida (Kalchbr. ex Cooke) Zmitr., (2018)
- Fomes lucidus Levss. ex Fr. (sic) possibly (Curtis) Sacc. 1888 accepted as Ganoderma lucidum (Curtis) P. Karst., (1881)
- Fomes mastoporus (Lév.) Cooke 1885 accepted as Ganoderma orbiforme (Fr.) Ryvarden (2000)
- Fomes mcgregori Bres. 1912 accepted as Fulvifomes mcgregorii (Bres.) Y.C. Dai [as 'macgregorii'], (2010)
- Fomes melanoporus Cooke (sic) possibly (Mont.) Sacc. 1885, accepted as Nigrofomes melanoporus (Mont.) Murrill, (1904)
- Fomes minutulus Henn. 1895, accepted as Perenniporia inflexibilis (Berk.) Ryvarden, (1972)
- Fomes mundulus Wakef. 1936 accepted as Perenniporia mundula (Wakef.) Ryvarden, (1972)
- Fomes niaouli (Pat.) Lloyd 1915 accepted as Phellinus rimosus (Berk.) Pilát, (1940)
- Fomes nubilis Cooke var. albo-limbatus Kalchbr.(sic) possibly Fomes nubilus var. albolimbatus (Cooke) Sacc. 1888
- Fomes oroflavus Lloyd 1915 accepted as Ganoderma australe (Fr.) Pat., (1889)
- Fomes pectinatus (Klotzsch) Gillet 1885 accepted as Phylloporia pectinata (Klotzsch) Ryvarden, (1991)
- Fomes pinicola Cooke (sic) possibly (Sw.) Fr. 1849 accepted as Fomitopsis pinicola (Sw.) P. Karst., (1881)
- Fomes pseudosenex (Murrill) Sacc. & Trotter 1912
- Fomes rimosus (Berk.) Cooke 1885 accepted as Phellinus rimosus (Berk.) Pilát, (1940)
- Fomes robinsoniae (Murrill) Sacc. & Trotter 1912 accepted as Fuscoporia wahlbergii (Fr.) T. Wagner & M. Fisch., (2001)
- Fomes robustus P. Karst. 1889 accepted as Fomitiporia robusta (P. Karst.) Fiasson & Niemelä, (1984)
- Fomes salicinus Kirckx. (sic) possibly (Pers. ex J.F. Gmel.) Gillet 1878, accepted as Phellinopsis conchata (Pers.) Y.C. Dai, (2010)
- Fomes senex (Nees & Mont.) Cooke 1885 accepted as Fuscoporia senex (Nees & Mont.) Ghob.-Nejh., (2007)
- Fomes torulosus (Pers.) Lloyd 1910 accepted as Fuscoporia torulosa (Pers.) T. Wagner & M. Fisch., (2001)
- Fomes umbraculum (Fr.) Sacc. 1888
- Fomes vegetus Cooke (sic) possibly (Fr.) Fr. 1849
- Fomes yucatanensis (Murrill) Sacc. & D. Sacc. 1905 accepted as Phellinus yucatanensis (Murrill) Imazeki [as yucatensis], (1943)
- Fomes zambesianus (Lloyd) Sacc. & Trotter 1925, accepted as Amauroderma preussii (Henn.) Steyaert, (1972)
- Fomes zuluensis Wakef. 1948 accepted as Fomitopsis zuluensis (Wakef.) Ryvarden [as zuuluensis], (1972)

Genus Fomitella

- Fomitella supina (Sw.) Murrill, (1905) recorded as Fomes hemileucus(Berk. & M.A. Curtis) Sacc. 1885

== Fr ==
Genus: Fracchiaea Sacc. 1873

- Fracchiaea heterogenea Sacc. 1873

== Fr ==
Genus: Fumago Pers. 1822

- Fumago vagans Pers. 1822

== Fu ==
Genus: Fusarium Link 1809

- Fusarium acuminatum Ellis & Everh., (1895) recorded as Fusarium scirpi Lambotte & Fautrey 1894
- Fusarium aloes Kalchbr. & Cooke 1880
- Fusarium angustum Sherb. 1915 accepted as Fusarium oxysporum Schltdl., (1824)
- Fusarium argillaceum (Fr.) Sacc. 1886 accepted as Rectifusarium ventricosum (Appel & Wollenw.) L. Lombard & Crous, (2015)
- Fusarium avenaceum (Fr.) Sacc. 1886
- Fusarium avenaceum f. 1 Wollenw. & Reinking possibly Fusarium avenaceum var. volutum (Wollenw.) Wollenw. & Reinking, (1935) accepted as Fusarium avenaceum (Fr.) Sacc., (1886)
- Fusarium baccharidicola Henn. 1908
- Fusarium bulbigenum Cooke & Massee 1887 accepted as Fusarium oxysporum Schltdl., (1824)
- Fusarium bulbigenum var. blasticola (Rostr.) Wollenw. 1931 accepted as Fusarium oxysporum Schltdl., (1824)
- Fusarium bulbigenum var. lycopersici (Sacc.) Wollenw. & Reinking 1930 accepted as Fusarium oxysporum Schltdl., (1824)
- Fusarium bulbigenum var. niveum (E.F. Sm.) Wollenw. 1931 accepted as Fusarium oxysporum Schltdl., (1824)
- Fusarium bulbigenum var. tracheiphilum (E.F. Sm.) Wollenw. 1931 accepted as Fusarium oxysporum Schltdl., (1824)
- Fusarium cepae Hanzawa 1914 accepted as Fusarium oxysporum Schltdl., (1824)
- Fusarium chlamydosporum Wollenw. & Reinking 1925
- Fusarium ciliatum Link 1825
- Fusarium coccinellum Kalchbr. 1875
- Fusarium coccophilum (Desm.) Wollenw. & Reinking 1935 accepted as Microcera coccophila Desm., (1848)
- Fusarium coeruleum Sacc.
- Fusarium compactum (Wollenw.) Raillo, (1950) recorded as Fusarium scirpi var. compactum Wollenw. 1930
- Fusarium conglutinans Wollenw. 1913 accepted as Fusarium oxysporum Schltdl., (1824)
- Fusarium conglutinans var. callistephi Beach 1918 accepted as Fusarium oxysporum Schltdl., (1824)
- Fusarium conglutinans var. majus Wollenw. 1930 accepted as Fusarium oxysporum Schltdl., (1824)
- Fusarium congoense Wollenw. 1916 accepted as Fusarium heterosporum Nees & T. Nees, (1818)
- Fusarium congoense var. septatius Wollenw. 1924
- Fusarium culmorum (Wm.G. Sm.) Sacc. 1892
- Fusarium decemcellulare Brick 1908 accepted as Albonectria rigidiuscula (Berk. & Broome) Rossman & Samuels, (1999)
- Fusarium dianthi Prill. & Delacr. 1899 accepted as Fusarium oxysporum Schltdl., (1824)
- Fusarium dimerum Penz. 1882 accepted as Bisifusarium dimerum (Penz.) L. Lombard & Crous, (2015)
- Fusarium diversisporum Sherb. 1915 [as diversisporium]
- Fusarium equiseti (Corda) Sacc. 1886
- Fusarium equiseti var. bullatum (Sherb.) Wollenw. 1930 accepted as Fusarium gibbosum Appel & Wollenw., (1910) [1913]
- Fusarium expansum Schltdl. 1824
- Fusarium filiferum (Preuss) Wollenw., (1916) recorded as Fusarium scirpi var. filiferum (Preuss) Wollenw. 1916
- Fusarium graminearum Schwabe 1839
- Fusarium granulare Kalchbr. 1882 as ''granulari''
- Fusarium heterosporum Nees & T. Nees 1818
- Fusarium heterosporum var. congoense (Wollenw.) Wollenw. 1931 [as congoensis]
- Fusarium incarnatum (Desm.) Sacc. 1886
- Fusarium javanicum Koord. 1907 accepted as Fusarium solani (Mart.) Sacc., (1881)
- Fusarium javanicum var. radicicola Wollenw. 1931 accepted as Fusarium solani (Mart.) Sacc., (1881)
- Fusarium lateritium Nees 1816
- Fusarium lateritium var. longum Wollenw. 1916 accepted as Fusarium stilboides Wollenw., (1924)
- Fusarium lateritium var. majus (Wollenw.) Wollenw. 1930 accepted as Fusarium lateritium Nees, (1816) [1816-17]
- Fusarium lini Bolley 1901 accepted as Fusarium oxysporum Schltdl., (1824)
- Fusarium lycopersici Bruschi 1912 accepted as Fusarium oxysporum Schltdl., (1824)
- Fusarium moniliforme J. Sheld. 1904 accepted as Fusarium fujikuroi Nirenberg, (1976)
- Fusarium moniliforme var. erumpens Wollenw. & Reinking 1925 accepted as Fusarium fujikuroi Nirenberg, (1976)
- Fusarium moniliforme var. subglutinans Wollenw. & Reinking 1925 accepted as Fusarium fujikuroi Nirenberg, (1976)
- Fusarium orthoceras Appel & Wollenw. 1910 accepted as Fusarium oxysporum Schltdl., (1824)
- Fusarium orthoceras var. albidoviolaceum (Dasz.) Wollenw. 1916 accepted as Fusarium oxysporum Schltdl., (1824)
- Fusarium neocosmosporiellum O'Donnell & Geiser, (2013) recorded as Fusarium vasinfectum var. pisi C.J.J. Hall 1903
- Fusarium orthoceras var. longius (Sherb.) Wollenw. 1916 accepted as Fusarium oxysporum Schltdl., (1824)
- Fusarium oxysporum Schltdl. 1824,
- Fusarium oxysporum f. 1 Wollenw.*
- Fusarium oxysporum f. 7 Wollenw.*
- Fusarium oxysporum f. 8 Snyder.*
- Fusarium oxysporum var. aurantiacum (Link) Wollenw. 1931 accepted as Fusarium oxysporum Schltdl., (1824)
- Fusarium oxysporum var. cubense (E.F. Sm.) Wollenw. 1935 accepted as Fusarium oxysporum Schltdl., (1824)
- Fusarium oxvsporum var. gladioli Massey 1926 accepted as Fusarium oxysporum Schltdl., (1824)
- Fusarium oxysporum var. nicotianae J. Johnson 1920 accepted as Fusarium oxysporum Schltdl., (1824)
- Fusarium pallidoroseum (Cooke) Sacc., (1886) recorded as Fusarium semitectum var. majus Wollenw. 1930
- Fusarium putaminum (Thüm.) Sacc. 1886
- Fusarium redolens Wollenw. f. 1 Wollenw. possibly Fusarium redolens Wollenw. 1913
- Fusarium reticulatum Mont. f. 1 Wollenw. possibly Fusarium reticulatum Mont. 1843
- Fusarium roseum Kalchbr. (sic) possibly Link 1809
- Fusarium sambucinum Fuckel 1870 accepted as Fusarium roseum Link, (1809)
- Fusarium sambucinum f. 2 Wollenw. probably accepted as Fusarium roseum Link, (1809)
- Fusarium sambucinum f. 6 Wollenw. probably accepted as Fusarium roseum Link, (1809)
- Fusarium scirpi Lambotte & Fautrey 1894 accepted as Fusarium acuminatum Ellis & Everh., (1895)
- Fusarium scirpi var. acuminatum (Ellis & Everh.) Wollenw. 1930 accepted as Fusarium acuminatum Ellis & Everh., (1895)
- Fusarium scirpi var. compactum Wollenw. 1930 accepted as Fusarium compactum (Wollenw.) Raillo, (1950)
- Fusarium scirpi var. filiferum (Preuss) Wollenw. 1916 accepted as Fusarium filiferum (Preuss) Wollenw., (1916)
- Fusarium semitectum var. majus Wollenw. 1930 accepted as Fusarium pallidoroseum (Cooke) Sacc., (1886)
- Fusarium solani Appel & Wollenw. (sic)(Mart.) Sacc. 1881
- Fusarium solani var. martii f. 1 Wollenw. possibly (Appel & Wollenw.) Wollenw. 1930 accepted as F solani (Mart.) Sacc. 1881
- Fusarium solani var. martii f. 2 Snyder**
- Fusarium sporotrichioides Sherb. 1915
- Fusarium stilboides Wollenw. 1924
- Fusarium vasinfectum G.F. Atk. 1892 accepted as Fusarium oxysporum Schltdl., (1824)
- Fusarium vasinfectum f. 2 Wollenw. & Reinking**
- Fusarium vasinfectum var. lutulatum (Sherb.) Wollenw. 1930 accepted as Fusarium oxysporum Schltdl., (1824)
- Fusarium vasinfectum var. pisi C.J.J. Hall 1903 accepted as Fusarium neocosmosporiellum O'Donnell & Geiser, (2013)
- Fusarium vasinfectum var. zonatum (Sherb.) f. 1 Wollenw. probably var. zonatum (Sherb.) Wollenw. 1930 accepted as Fusarium oxysporum Schltdl., (1824)
- Fusarium vasinfectum var. zonatum f. 2 Wollenw.**
- Fusarium sp.

Genus: Fusella Sacc. 1886

- Fusella zambeziana Torrend 1914 [as zambesiana]

Genus: Fusicladium Bonord. 1851 accepted as Venturia Sacc., (1882)

- Fusicladium crataegi Aderh. 1902 accepted as Venturia crataegi Aderh., (1902)
- Fusicladium dendriticum (Wallr.) Fuckel 1870 accepted as Venturia inaequalis (Cooke) G. Winter, (1875)
- Fusicladium dendriticum var. eriobotryae Scalia 1901 accepted as Venturia inaequalis (Cooke) G. Winter, (1875)
- Fusicladium eriobotryae (Cavara) Sacc. 1892 accepted as Fusicladium pyracanthae (Thüm.) O. Rostr., (1912)
- Fusicladium fuliginosum Kalchbr. & Cooke 1880
- Fusicladium pyrorum (Lib.) Fuckel [as pirinum],(1870) accepted as Venturia pyrina Aderh. [as 'pirina'], (1896)
- Fusicladium pirinum var. pyracanthae probably Fusicladium pyrorum var. pyracanthae Thüm. 1877, accepted as Fusicladium pyracanthae (Thüm.) O. Rostr., (1912)

Genus: Fusicoccum Corda 1829,

- Fusicoccum africanum Van der Byl 1927
- Fusicoccum viticola Reddick 1909, [as viticolum] accepted as Diaporthe neoviticola Udayanga, Crous & K.D. Hyde, (2012)

== See also ==
- List of bacteria of South Africa
- List of Oomycetes of South Africa
- List of slime moulds of South Africa
- List of fungi of South Africa
  - List of fungi of South Africa – A
  - List of fungi of South Africa – B
  - List of fungi of South Africa – C
  - List of fungi of South Africa – D
  - List of fungi of South Africa – E
  - List of fungi of South Africa – F
  - List of fungi of South Africa – G
  - List of fungi of South Africa – H
  - List of fungi of South Africa – I
  - List of fungi of South Africa – J
  - List of fungi of South Africa – K
  - List of fungi of South Africa – L
  - List of fungi of South Africa – M
  - List of fungi of South Africa – N
  - List of fungi of South Africa – O
  - List of fungi of South Africa – P
  - List of fungi of South Africa – Q
  - List of fungi of South Africa – R
  - List of fungi of South Africa – S
  - List of fungi of South Africa – T
  - List of fungi of South Africa – U
  - List of fungi of South Africa – V
  - List of fungi of South Africa – W
  - List of fungi of South Africa – X
  - List of fungi of South Africa – Y
  - List of fungi of South Africa – Z
