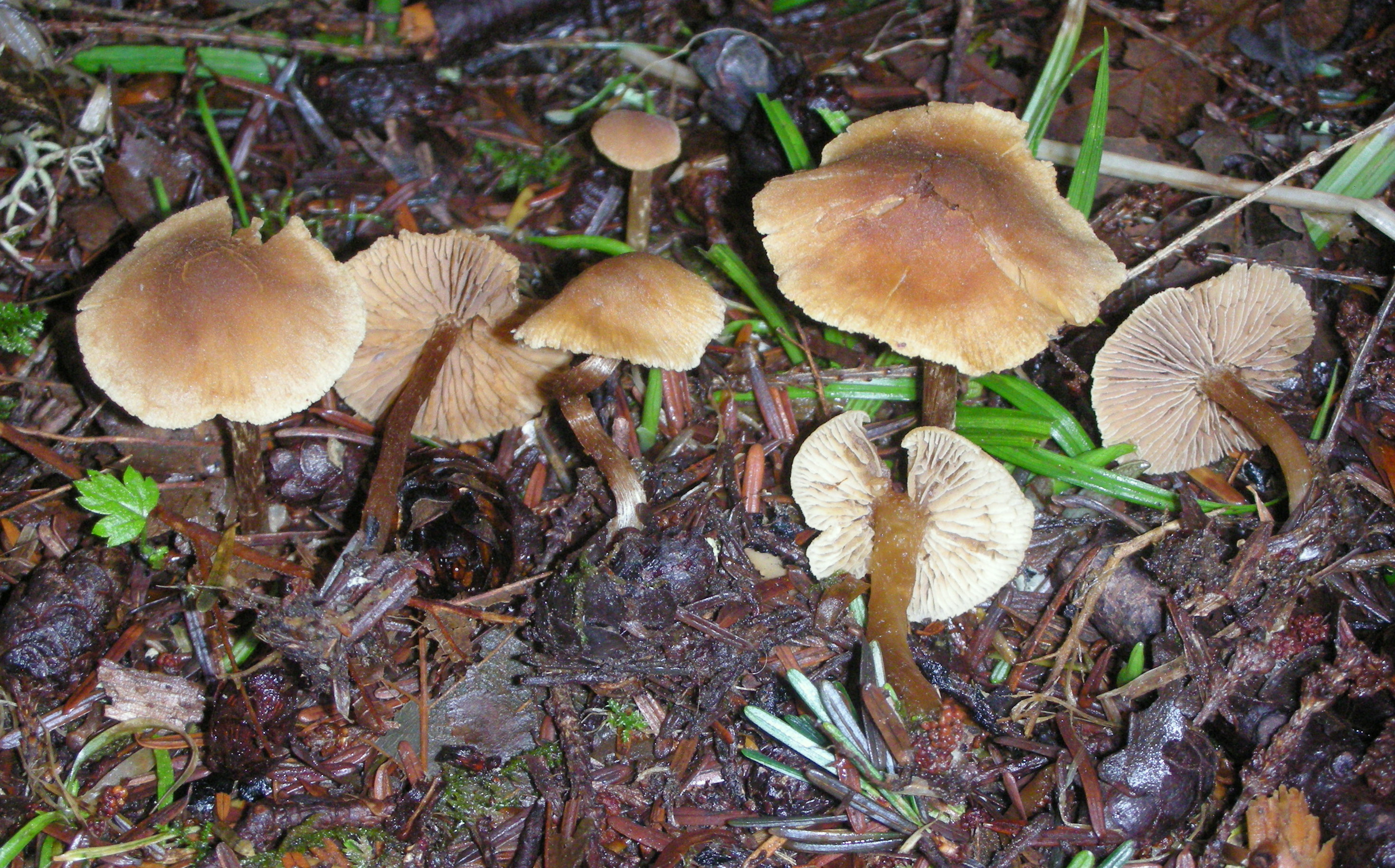

Scientific classification
- Kingdom: Fungi
- Division: Basidiomycota
- Class: Agaricomycetes
- Order: Agaricales
- Family: Hymenogastraceae
- Genus: Alnicola
- Species: A. escharioides

Binomial name
- Alnicola escharioides (Fr.) Romagn.

Synonyms
- Naucoria escharioides (Fr.) P. Kumm.

= Alnicola escharioides =

Species of fungus

Alnicola escharioides
- Mycological characteristics
- Gills on hymenium
- Cap is convex or flat
- Hymenium is adnate or decurrent
- Stipe has a cortina
- Spore print is brown
- Ecology is mycorrhizal
- Edibility is unknown or inedible

Alnicola escharioides, also known as Naucoria escharioides and commonly known as the brown alder mushroom or ochre aldercap, is a species of mushroom in the genus Alnicola.

It is found in Europe. There are also multiple North American species that are still classified as A. escharioides.

== Description ==
The brown cap is about 1-4 centimeters in diameter. It starts out convex, but sometimes becomes flat or even uplifted around the margins when the mushroom matures. When the mushroom is older, the cap starts to split at the margins and become wavy. The gills can be adnate or somewhat decurrent, and can be brown or beige in color. When the mushroom is young, a cortina covers the gills. When the cortina breaks, it leaves remnants on the stipe. The stipe is about 1.5-4 centimeters long and 1-4 millimeters wide, and is yellowish brown in color. It is fibrillose. The spore print is brown.

== Habitat and ecology ==
Alnicola escharioides grows under alder trees, which it forms a mycorrhizal association with. It is often found around wetlands.
