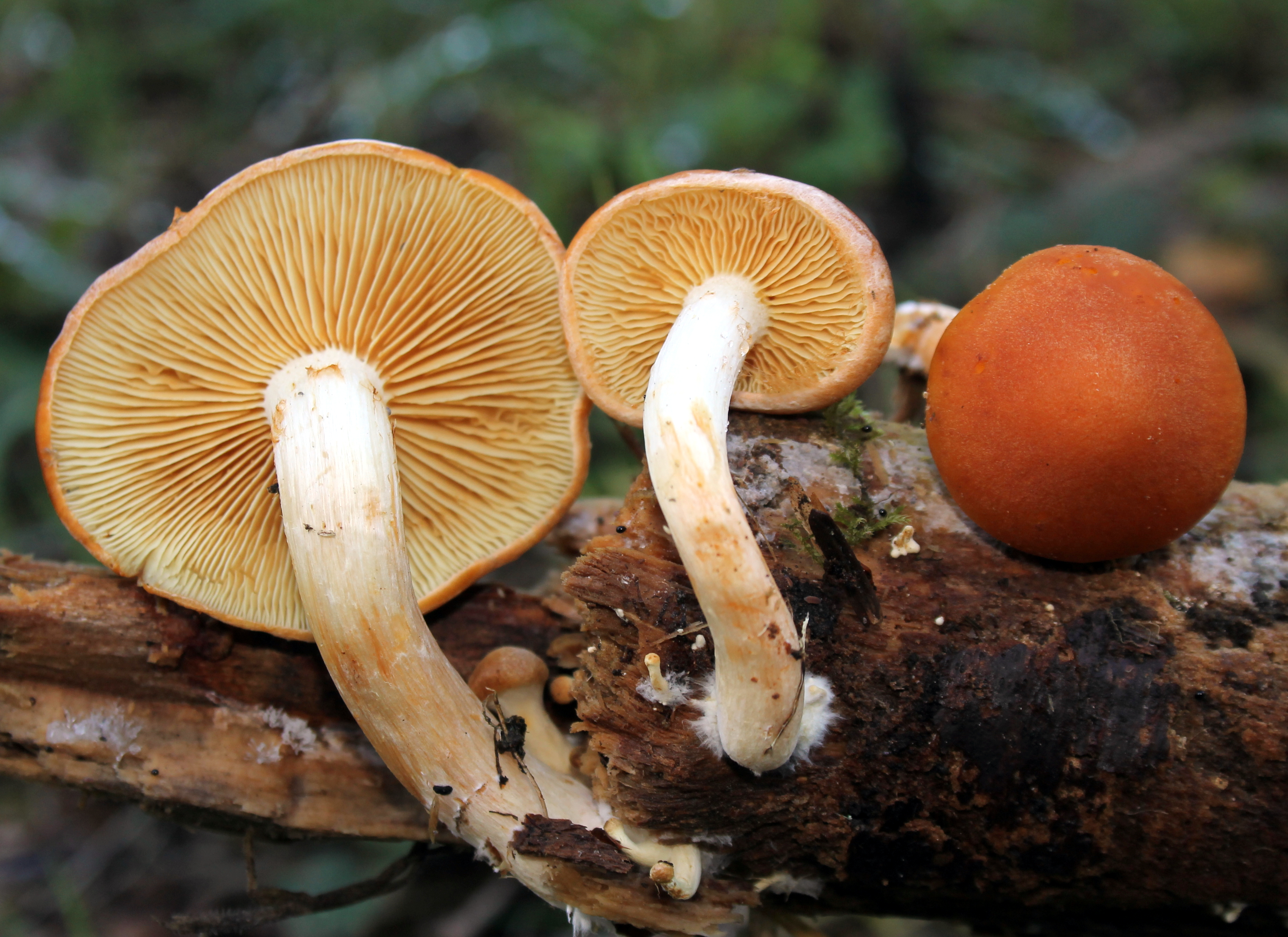

Scientific classification
- Domain: Eukaryota
- Kingdom: Fungi
- Division: Basidiomycota
- Class: Agaricomycetes
- Order: Agaricales
- Family: Hymenogastraceae
- Genus: Gymnopilus
- Species: G. sapineus

Binomial name
- Gymnopilus sapineus (Fr.) Maire

Synonyms
- Agaricus sapineus Fries (1815)

= Gymnopilus sapineus =

Species of fungus

Gymnopilus sapineus Mycological characteristics
- Gills on hymenium
- Cap is convex
- Hymenium is adnate
- Stipe has a ring
- Spore print is reddish-brown
- Ecology is saprotrophic
- Edibility is inedible

Gymnopilus sapineus, commonly known as the scaly rustgill or common and boring gymnopilus, is a species of fungus. The small mushroom has a rusty orange spore print and a bitter taste. It grows on dead conifer wood throughout North America.

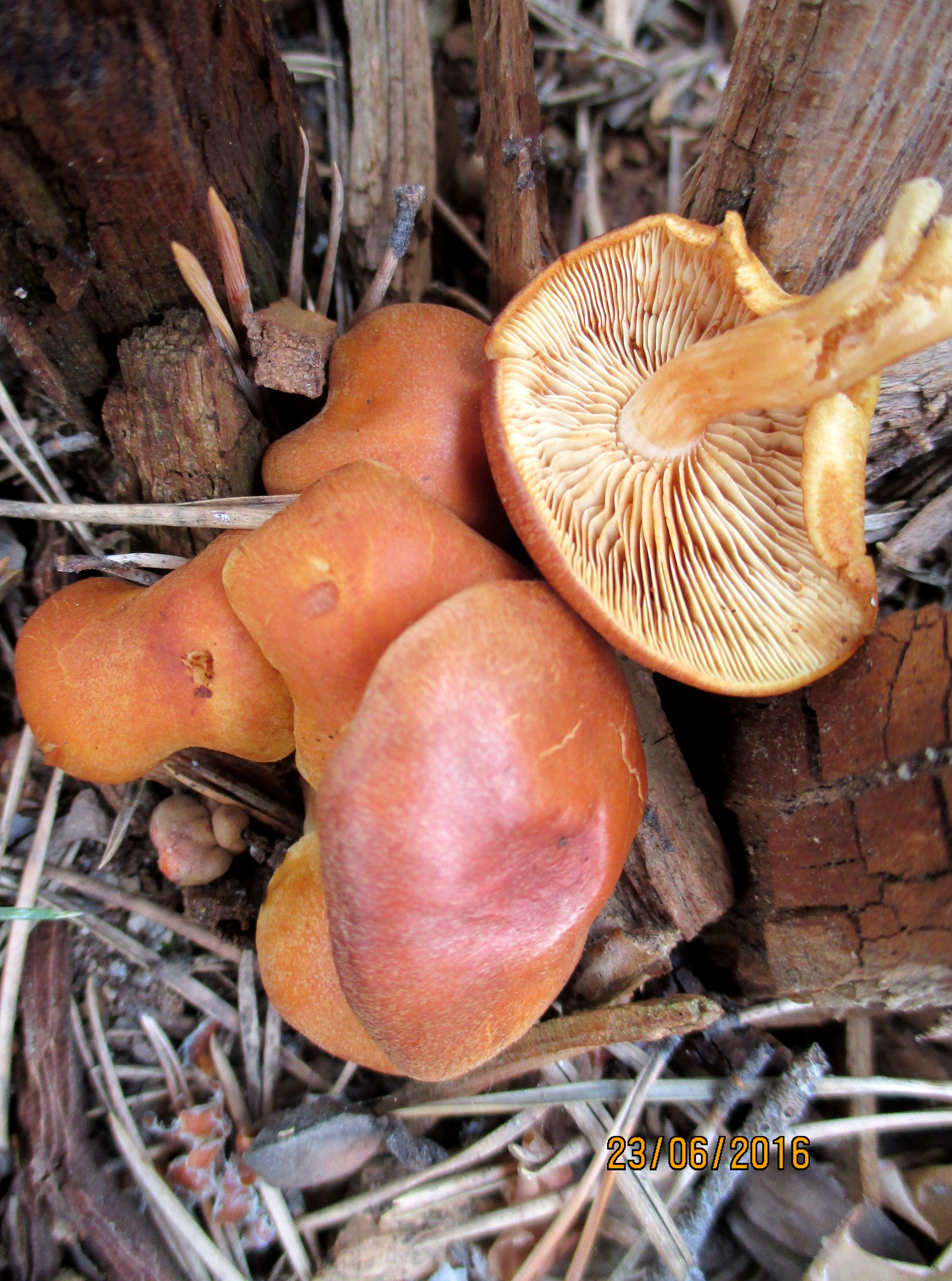
G. sapineus growing from rotten wood chips

== Taxonomy ==
Speciation in Gymnopilus is not clearly defined. This is further complicated by the macroscopic morphological and ecological similarities between members of the G. sapineus complex such as G. penetrans and G. nevadensis. Michael Kuo explicates upon this by speaking of the arbitrary distinction made between G. sapineus and G. penetrans made by Elias Magnus Fries. He at first labeled G. penetrans to merely be a form of G. sapineus in 1815, but then recanted and labeled them separate in 1821.

== Description ==
The cap is 2–8 cm (3/4–3 1/8 in) across, is convex to flat, and is golden-yellow to brownish orange, darker at the center with a dry scaly surface which is often fibrillose and may have squamules. The cap margin is inrolled at first and curves outward as it matures, becoming almost plane and sometimes developing fibrillose cracks in age. The flesh is yellow to orange and delicate when compared to larger and firmer members of Gymnopilus, such as G. junonius.

The gills are crowded, yellow at first, turning rusty orange as the spores mature, with adnate attachment. The spores are rusty orange to rusty brown, elliptical, rough, and 7–10 x 4–6 μm.

The stipe is 3–7 cm (1 1/8–2 3/4 in) long and 0.5–1 cm thick. It has either an equal structure, or becomes thinner near the base. It is light yellow, bruising rusty brown. The stipe has an evanescent veil which often leaves fragments on the upper part of the stipe or the margin of young caps.

The species sometimes tastes bitter, and has a mild, fungoid or sweet smell. It is nonpoisonous, but considered inedible.

It does not stain blue and lacks the hallucinogen psilocybin.

=== Similar species ===
This mushroom is often mistaken for G. luteocarneus which grows on conifers and has a smoother and darker cap. Another lookalike is G. penetrans which grows in the same habitat and has minor microscopic differences.

Other similar species include G. aeruginosus, G. luteofolius, and G. hybridus. It can also resemble members of Pholiota and Cortinarius section Callistei.

== Habitat and distribution ==
G. sapineus can be found on rotting wood under conifer trees throughout North America, generally from June to September, or September to February on the West Coast.

== See also ==
- List of Gymnopilus species
