= Anjali Roy =

Indian mycologist, professor and author

Professor Anjali Roy
- Born: April 1930; Rajshahi
- Died: 22 January 2017 (aged 86); Kolkata, West Bengal, India
- Education: University of Calcutta
- Known for: Taxonomy of polypores
- Scientific career
- Fields: Mycology
- Institutions: School of Tropical Medicine, Calcutta; University of Burdwan; Visva-Bharati University
- Doctoral advisor: S. N. Banerjee
- Other academic advisors: Mildred Katherine Nobles

Anjali Roy (April 1930 – 22 January 2017) was an eminent Indian mycologist and academic. The fungus genus Royoporus is named in her honour.

== Early life ==
Roy was born in April 1930 in Rajshahi, then in pre-Independence India and now in Bangladesh. She passed her matriculation examination from the girls' school there in 1945. She graduated with honors in botany from Presidency College, Calcutta, and her post-graduation from Ballygunge Science College in 1952. She obtained a D.Sc. from the Calcutta University under the guidance of S. N. Banerjee.

== Early research and academics ==
Roy's initial post-doctoral research, on the Coriolellus, was conducted in Canada where she was mentored by Mildred K. Nobles. Returning to India, she began work as a medical mycologist in the Calcutta School of Tropical Medicine. In 1974, she joined the University of Burdwan as a lecturer. Five years later, she moved to the Visva-Bharati University, where she remained until she retired in 1995. Roy as professor mentored 10 Ph.D. students.

== Specialization in polypores ==
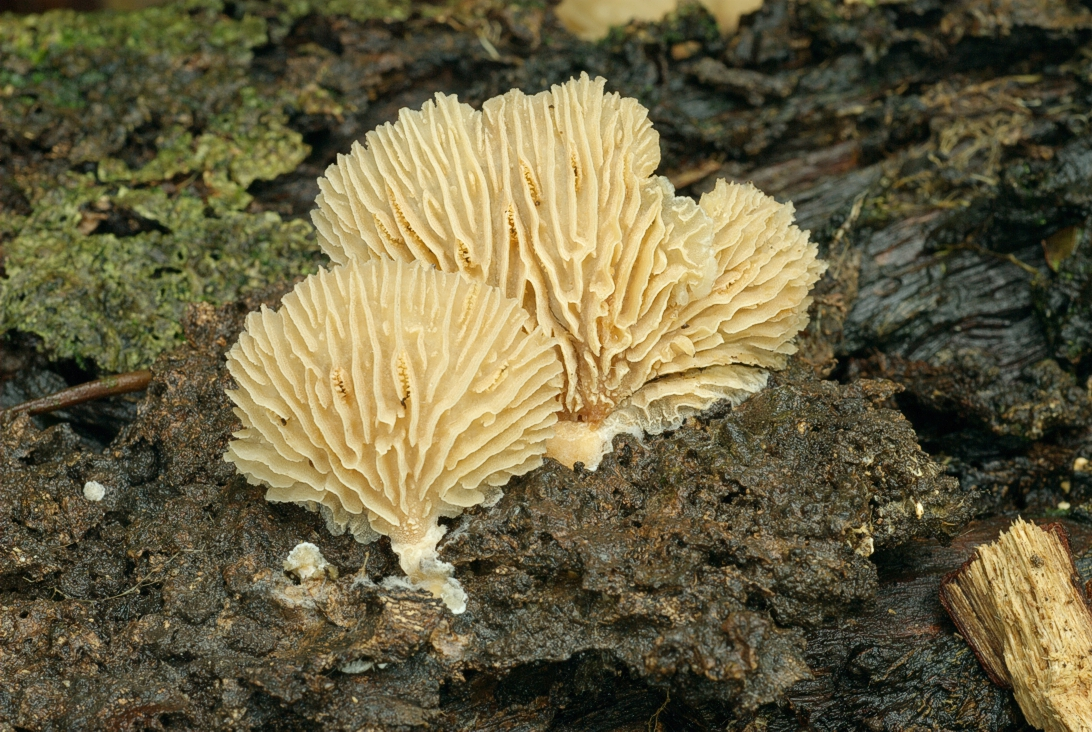
Elmerina holophaea, a polypore with gills

Roy developed a lasting interest in wood-rotting polypores, and devoted herself to the taxonomy of the group of fungi, characterizing them based on morphology, anatomy, characteristics in cultures, chemical responses, the type of rot they induced and their sexuality. She authored around 150 papers on the subject, and was published in authoritative journals in her field. She also served on the advisory committee of the Journal of Mycopathological Research, the official journal of the Indian Mycological Society.

Roy's research culminated in a monograph titled Polyporaceae of India in 1996, a collaboration with her student Asit Baran De. The monograph summarized 114 Polyporaceae species, based mainly on the authors' own material collected over a forty-year period from across India. Besides, they also studied the collections at many botanical institutions, especially in the Presidency College and the Forest Research Institute in Dehradun.

De went on to name a genus of Polyporaceae, Royoporus, in her honour.

Roy died on 22 January 2017.

== Bibliography ==
Books:

- Roy, Anjali and De, Asit Baran (1996). Polyporaceae of India. International Book Distributors, Dehradun, India. pp. 309. ISBN 978-8170892137

Journal Articles:

- Studies on hyperpigmented form of Trichophyton rubrum. Mycopathol. 27:1–8 (1965).
- Anatomy of Indian Polyporaceae. Bull. Bot. Soc. Bengal 22, (1968).
- A significant variation of Microsporum gypseum. Mycopathol. 37:45–48, (1969).
- Anatomy of India Polyporaceae V: Polyporus anthelminticus Berk. Visva Bharati Annals (Sc.) Part II. 14, 20–29, (1971).
- Some micro-structures in relation to Polyporaceae. Mycopath. Mycol. Appl. 48, 111–119, (1972).
- Record of Poria xylostromatoides from India. Sci. and Cult., 39,179–398, (1973).
- Anatomy of India Polyporaceae VI: Hexagonia discopoda and H. sulcata. Bull. Bot. Soc. Bengal 29, 57–64, (1975).
- Structures of zones in fruiting bodies of Polyporaceae. Nova Hedwigia 27, 801-804, (1976).
- Taxonomy of Fomes durissimus. Mycologia 71, 1005–1009, (1979).
- Studies on Indian Polypores IV, Morphological and cultural characters of Polyporus grammocephalus. Mycologia 73 (1), 150–156, (1981).
- Studies on Indian Polypores.VI. Morphological and cultural characters of Irpex flavus Klotzch. Nova Hedwigia. 34, 259–263, (1981).
- Studies on Indian Polypores-VIII. Morphological and Cultural characters of Ganoderma colossum (Fr.) Torrend. Ibid. 35, 749–754, (1981).
- Studies on Indian Polypores.V. Morphological and cultural characters of Trametes cubensis. Can. J. Bot. 60, 192–1015, (1982).
- Hyphal system in Aphyllophorales and their respective evolution. Science and Culture 48, 372–376, (1982).
- Wood-rotting fungi and their role in tree ecosystem. Science and Culture 48, 246–268, (1983).
- New records of two wood rotting fungi from India. Indian Forester 11(2), With Mitra, A and Dutta, S (1985).
- Lignin Biodegradation - Present status and future. Current Science 56, 350-353, (1987).
- Cultural characters and mating system of Trametes lactinea. Nova Hedwigia 44, 121–124, (1987).
- Beta-glucosidase of a white-rot fungus Trametes gibbosa. Biochem. Internat. 28(5), With Bhattacharjee, B and Majumder, A L (1992).
- Taxonomy of Hexagonia scutellata comb. nov. J. Mycopath., With De, Asit Baran (1998).
