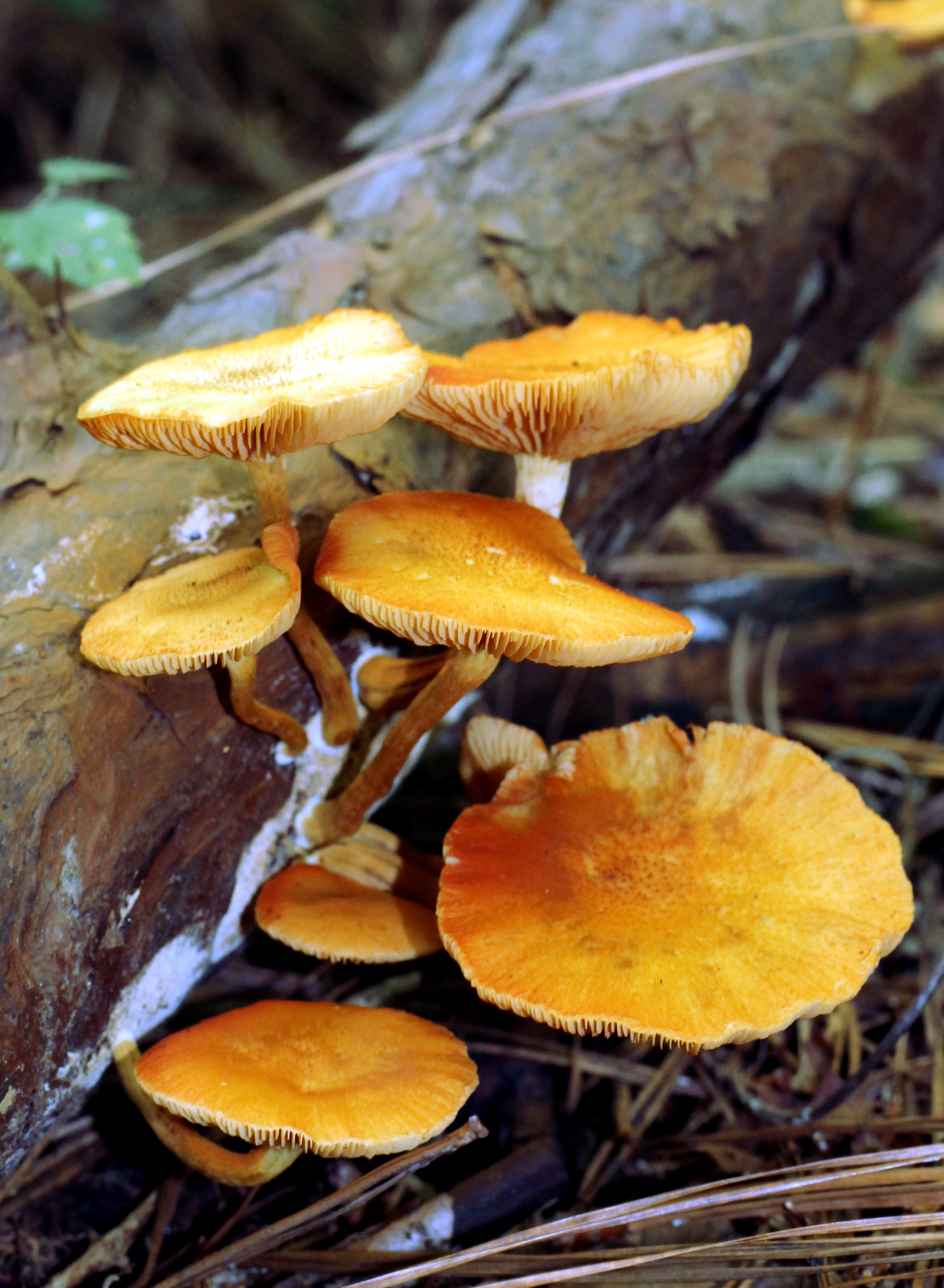

Scientific classification
- Domain: Eukaryota
- Kingdom: Fungi
- Division: Basidiomycota
- Class: Agaricomycetes
- Order: Agaricales
- Family: Hymenogastraceae
- Genus: Gymnopilus
- Species: G. underwoodii

Binomial name
- Gymnopilus underwoodii (Peck) Murrill (1917)

Synonyms
- Flammula underwoodii Peck (1896)

= Gymnopilus underwoodii =

Species of fungus

Gymnopilus underwoodii is a species of agaric fungus in the family Hymenogastraceae. Originally described in 1896 by Charles Peck as Flammula underwoodii, the fungus was given its current name by William Murrill in 1917. The specific epithet honors American mycologist Lucien Underwood.

== Description ==
The cap is 6 to 10 cm (2.4 to 3.9 in) in diameter.

== Habitat and distribution ==
Gymnopilus underwoodii has been found on pine logs and trunks. It is found in the US, from Virginia to Alabama and in Florida, fruiting from November to December.

== See also ==
- List of Gymnopilus species
