= Gibberella tricincta =

Scientific classification
- Domain: Eukaryota
- Kingdom: Fungi
- Division: Ascomycota
- Class: Sordariomycetes
- Order: Hypocreales
- Family: Nectriaceae
- Genus: Gibberella
- Species: G. tricincta

Binomial name
- Gibberella tricincta El-Gholl (1978)

Synonyms
- Fusarium citriforme Jamal., (1943); Fusarium sporotrichiella var. tricinctum (Corda) Bilai, (1987); Fusarium sporotrichiella var. tricinctum (Corda) Bilai,: 87 (1953); Fusarium sporotrichioides var. tricinctum (Corda) Raillo, (1950); Fusarium tricinctum (Corda) Sacc., (1886); Selenosporium tricinctum Corda, (1838)

Species of fungus

Gibberella tricincta is a fungal plant pathogen. Gibberella tricincta produces the antifungal alkaloid Fungerin.

== See also ==
- Gibberellic acid
