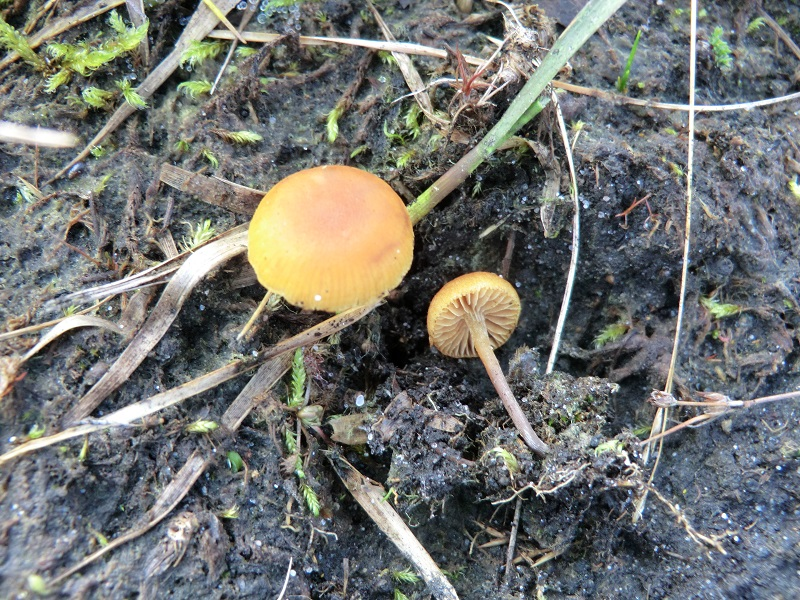
- Gymnopilus fulgens in NSG Heiliges Meer, Recke, Nordrhein-Westfalen, Germany

Scientific classification
- Domain: Eukaryota
- Kingdom: Fungi
- Division: Basidiomycota
- Class: Agaricomycetes
- Order: Agaricales
- Family: Hymenogastraceae
- Genus: Gymnopilus
- Species: G. fulgens

Binomial name
- Gymnopilus fulgens (J. Favre & Maire) Singer

= Gymnopilus fulgens =

Species of mushroom

Gymnopilus fulgens Mycological characteristics
- Gills on hymenium
- Cap is convex
- Hymenium is adnexed or adnate
- Ecology is saprotrophic

Gymnopilus fulgens is a species of mushroom in the family Hymenogastraceae. It was given its current name by mycologist Rolf Singer in 1951.

== Description ==
The cap is 0.5 to 2.5 centimetres (0.2 to 1.0 in) in diameter.

== Habitat and distribution ==
Gymnopilus fulgens grows among moss, on peaty soil, charred sphagnum, or burned-over soil. In the United States, it has been collected in Michigan, but it has also been found in Europe. It fruits from June to September.

== See also ==
List of Gymnopilus species
