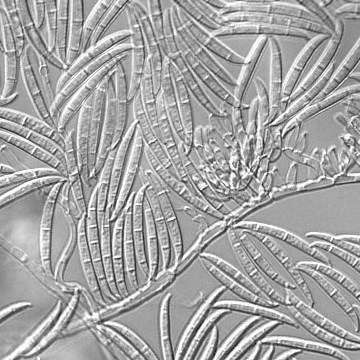
- Macroconidia of Gibberella zeae

Scientific classification
- Kingdom: Fungi
- Division: Ascomycota
- Class: Sordariomycetes
- Order: Hypocreales
- Family: Nectriaceae
- Genus: Gibberella

Species
- See text

= Gibberella =

Genus of fungi

Gibberella is a genus of fungi in the family Nectriaceae.

In 1926, Japanese scientists observed that rice plants infected with Gibberella had abnormally long stems ("foolish seedling disease").

A substance, gibberellin, was derived from this fungus. Gibberellin is a plant hormone that promotes cell elongation, flower formation, and seedling growth.

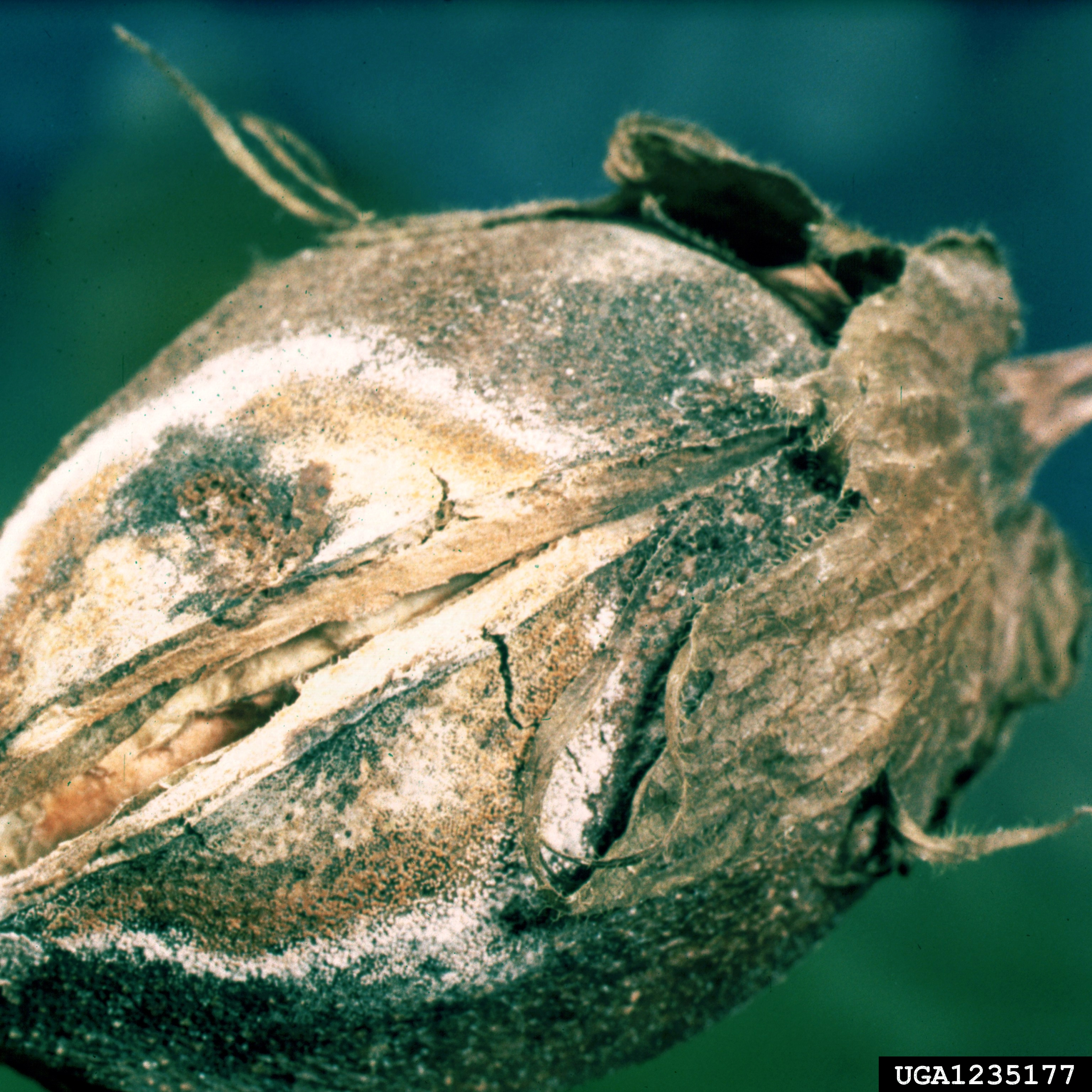
Gibberella fujikuroi on Gossypium hirsutum

== Etymology ==
Pier Andrea Saccardo named the genus "Gibberella" because of the hump (Latin, gibbera) on the fungal perithecium.

== Species ==
- Gibberella acerina
- Gibberella acervalis
- Gibberella africana
- Gibberella agglomerata
- Gibberella atrofuliginea
- Gibberella atrorufa
- Gibberella australis
- Gibberella avenacea
- Gibberella baccata
- Gibberella bambusae
- Gibberella bolusiellae
- Gibberella bresadolae
- Gibberella briosiana
- Gibberella butleri
- Gibberella buxi
- Gibberella cantareirensis
- Gibberella cicatrisata
- Gibberella circinata
- Gibberella coffeae
- Gibberella coronicola
- Gibberella creberrima
- Gibberella culmicola
- Gibberella cyanea
- Gibberella cyanogena
- Gibberella cyanospora
- Gibberella cylindrospora
- Gibberella effusa
- Gibberella engleriana
- Gibberella euonymi
- Gibberella ficina
- Gibberella flacca
- Gibberella fujikuroi
  - G. fujikuroi var. subglutinans
- Gibberella fusispora
- Gibberella gaditjirrii
- Gibberella gordonii
- Gibberella gossypina
- Gibberella heterochroma
- Gibberella hostae
- Gibberella imperatae
- Gibberella indica
- Gibberella intricans
- Gibberella juniperi
- Gibberella konza
- Gibberella lagerheimii
- Gibberella lateritia
- Gibberella longispora
- Gibberella macrolopha
- Gibberella malvacearum
- Gibberella mapaniae
- Gibberella maxima
- Gibberella nemorosa
- Gibberella nygamai
- Gibberella parasitica
- Gibberella passiflorae
- Gibberella phyllostachydicola
- Gibberella polycocca
- Gibberella pseudopulicaris
- Gibberella pulicaris
- Gibberella quinqueseptata
- Gibberella rhododendricola
- Gibberella rugosa
- Gibberella sacchari
- Gibberella spiraeae
- Gibberella stilboides
- Gibberella subtropica
- Gibberella thapsina
- Gibberella tilakii
- Gibberella tricincta
- Gibberella tritici
- Gibberella tropicalis
- Gibberella tumida
- Gibberella ulicis
- Gibberella venezuelana
- Gibberella violacea
- Gibberella vitis
- Gibberella xylarioides
- Gibberella zeae

== See also ==
- Auxin
- Ethylene as a plant hormone
- Gibberellic acid
