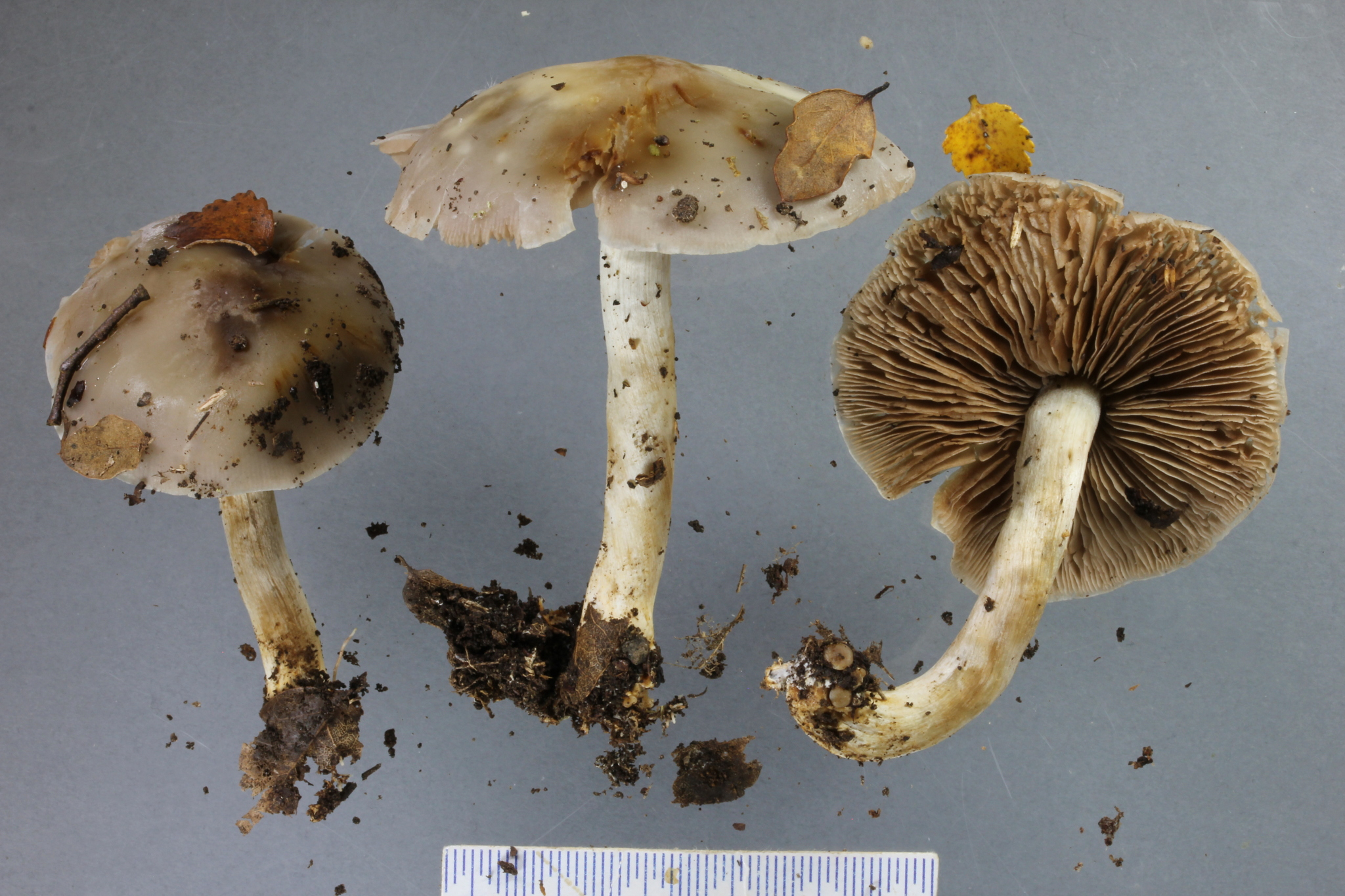
- Psathyloma leucocarpum

Scientific classification
- Kingdom: Fungi
- Division: Basidiomycota
- Class: Agaricomycetes
- Order: Agaricales
- Family: Hymenogastraceae
- Genus: Psathyloma; Soop, J.A. Cooper & Dima 2016

Type species
- Psathyloma leucocarpum Soop, J.A. Cooper & Dima (2016)

Species
- P. catervatim P. leucocarpum P. psathyrelloides

= Psathyloma =

Genus of fungi

Psathyloma is a genus of three species of mushroom-forming fungi in the family Hymenogastraceae. Used informally among New Zealand-based mycologists since 1997, the genus was formally circumscribed in 2016 with Psathyloma leucocarpum as the type species. The genus name, which combines Psathyrella and Hebeloma, alludes to the morphological similarity of the fruit bodies. Species in the genus Psathyloma are found in New Zealand, where they fruit on the ground in Nothofagus forests.
