= Gibberella cyanogena =

Scientific classification
- Kingdom: Fungi
- Division: Ascomycota
- Class: Sordariomycetes
- Order: Hypocreales
- Family: Nectriaceae
- Genus: Gibberella
- Species: G. cyanogena

Binomial name
- Gibberella cyanogena (Desm.) Sacc. (1883)

Synonyms
- Botryosphaeria cyanogena (Desm.) Niessl; Calonectria cyanogena (Desm.) Lar.N. Vassiljeva (1998); Sphaeria cyanogena Desm. (1848)

Species of fungus

Gibberella cyanogena is a fungal plant pathogen.
