= Gymnopilus arenophilus =

Scientific classification
- Kingdom: Fungi
- Division: Basidiomycota
- Class: Agaricomycetes
- Order: Agaricales
- Family: Hymenogastraceae
- Genus: Gymnopilus
- Species: G. arenophilus

Binomial name
- Gymnopilus arenophilus A. Ortega & Esteve-Rav. (2005)

Species of fungus

Gymnopilus arenophilus is a species of mushroom-forming fungus in the family Hymenogastraceae. It can be found in Spain and France.

== See also ==
- List of Gymnopilus species
