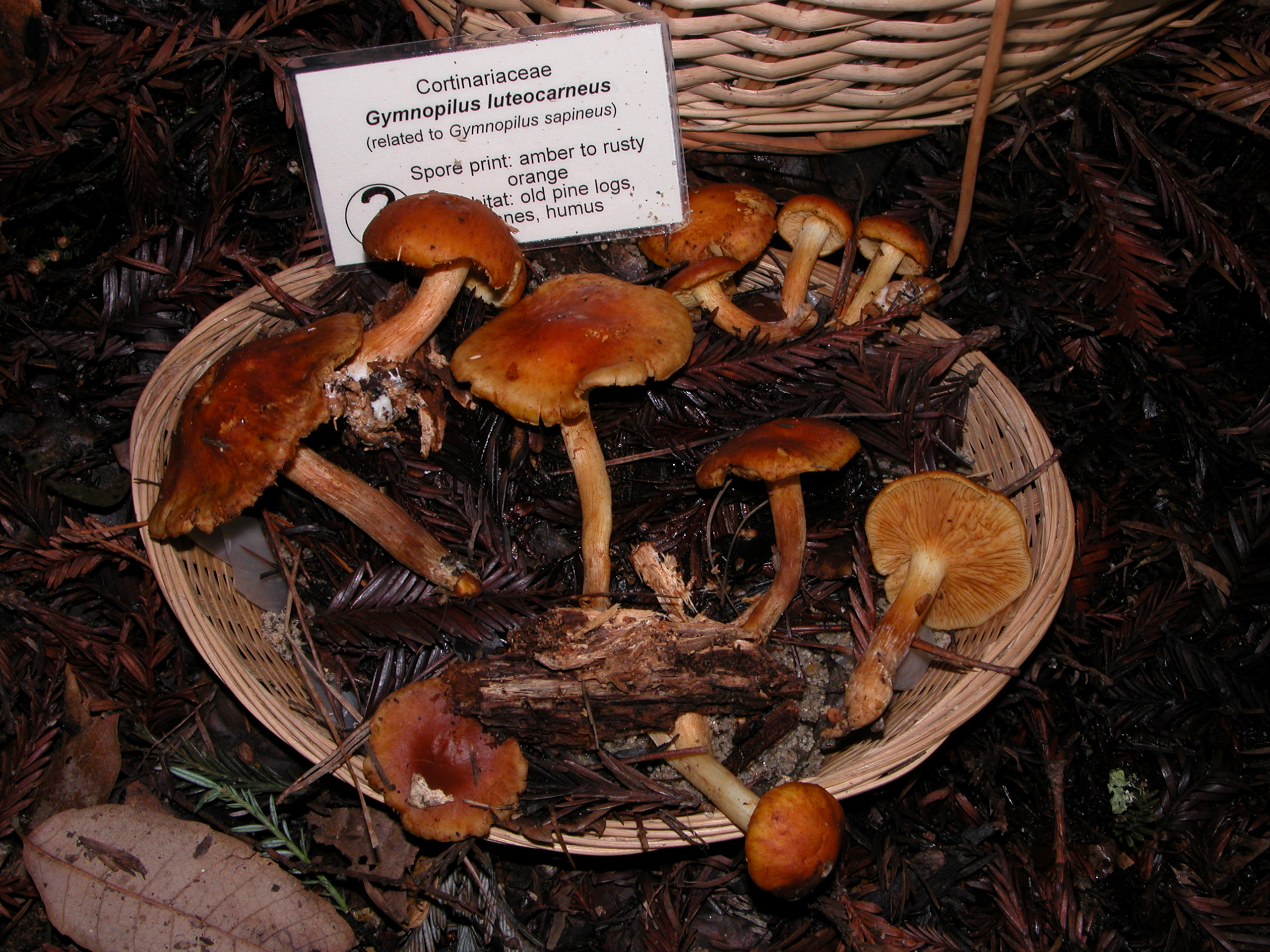

Scientific classification
- Kingdom: Fungi
- Division: Basidiomycota
- Class: Agaricomycetes
- Order: Agaricales
- Family: Hymenogastraceae
- Genus: Gymnopilus
- Species: G. luteocarneus

Binomial name
- Gymnopilus luteocarneus Hesler (1969)

= Gymnopilus luteocarneus =

Species of fungus

Gymnopilus luteocarneus
- Mycological characteristics
- Gills on hymenium
- Cap is convex
- Hymenium is adnexed or adnate
- Ecology is saprotrophic

Gymnopilus luteocarneus is a species of mushroom-forming fungus in the family Hymenogastraceae.

== Description ==
The cap is 3 to 5 centimetres (1.2 to 2.0 in) in diameter.

== Habitat and distribution ==
Gymnopilus luteocarneus grows solitary to scattered, on conifer logs. It has been found in California in November.

== See also ==
- List of Gymnopilus species
