= Gymnopilus arenicola =

Scientific classification
- Kingdom: Fungi
- Division: Basidiomycota
- Class: Agaricomycetes
- Order: Agaricales
- Family: Hymenogastraceae
- Genus: Gymnopilus
- Species: G. arenicola

Binomial name
- Gymnopilus arenicola Hesler (1969)

Species of fungus

Gymnopilus arenicola is a species of mushroom-forming fungus in the family Hymenogastraceae. It was described as new to science in 1969 by American mycologist Lexemuel Ray Hesler, from collections made in Washington.

== See also ==
- List of Gymnopilus species
