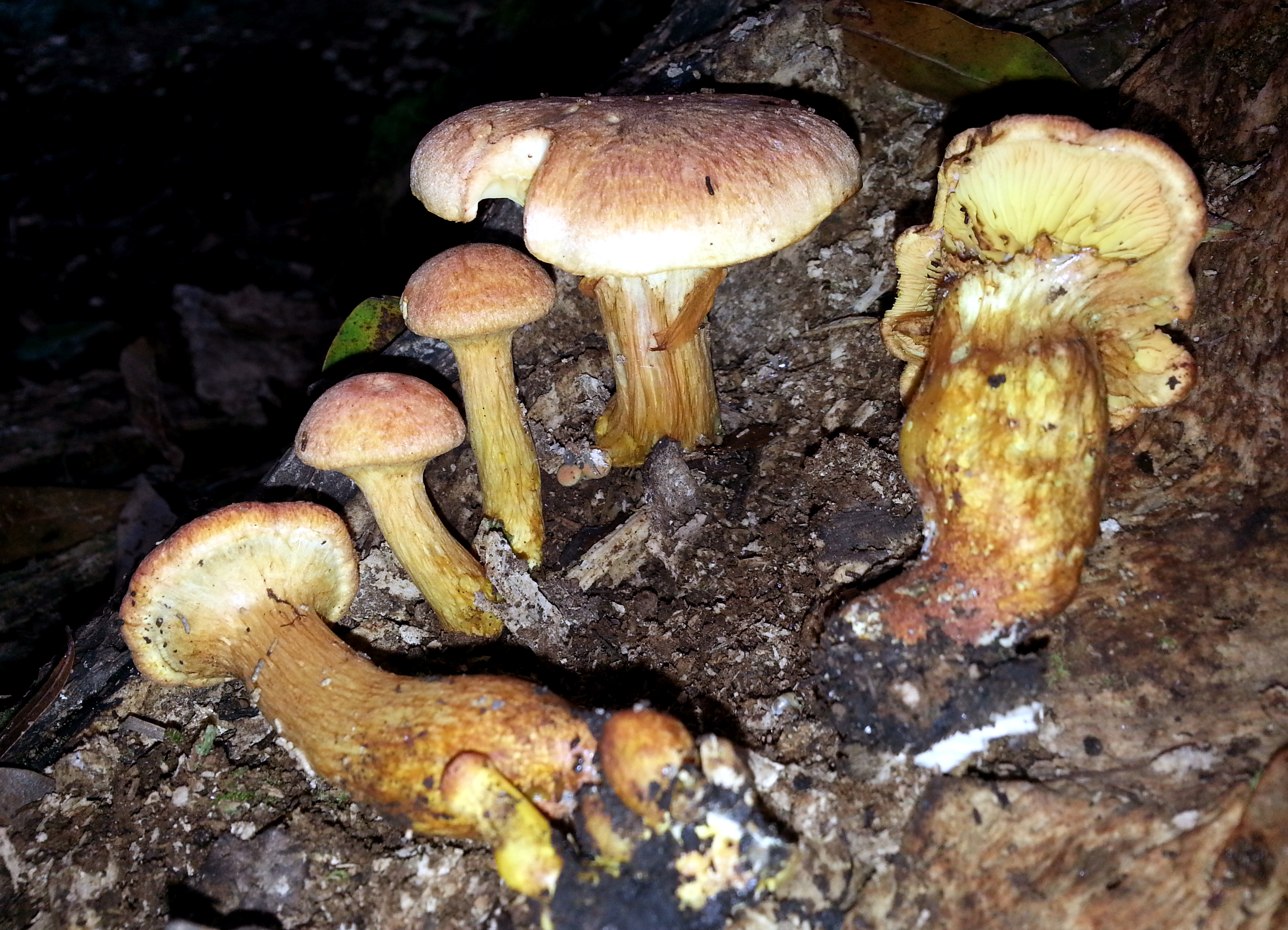

Scientific classification
- Domain: Eukaryota
- Kingdom: Fungi
- Division: Basidiomycota
- Class: Agaricomycetes
- Order: Agaricales
- Family: Hymenogastraceae
- Genus: Gymnopilus
- Species: G. imperialis

Binomial name
- Gymnopilus imperialis (Speg.) Singer

= Gymnopilus imperialis =

Species of fungus

Gymnopilus imperialis Mycological characteristics
- Gills on hymenium
- Cap is convex
- Hymenium is adnexed or adnate
- Ecology is saprotrophic

Gymnopilus imperialis is a species of mushroom in the family Hymenogastraceae. It was given its current name by mycologist Rolf Singer in 1951.

== Description ==
The cap is 5 to 10 centimetres (2.0 to 3.9 in) in diameter.

== Habitat and distribution ==
Gymnopilus imperialis fruitbodies are cespitose (clumped together at the stem), and are found on trunks or at the bases of living or dead frondose trees, especially Eucalyptus species. This species has been observed fruiting in April, October, and December; it is known from Jamaica and Brazil.

== See also ==
List of Gymnopilus species
