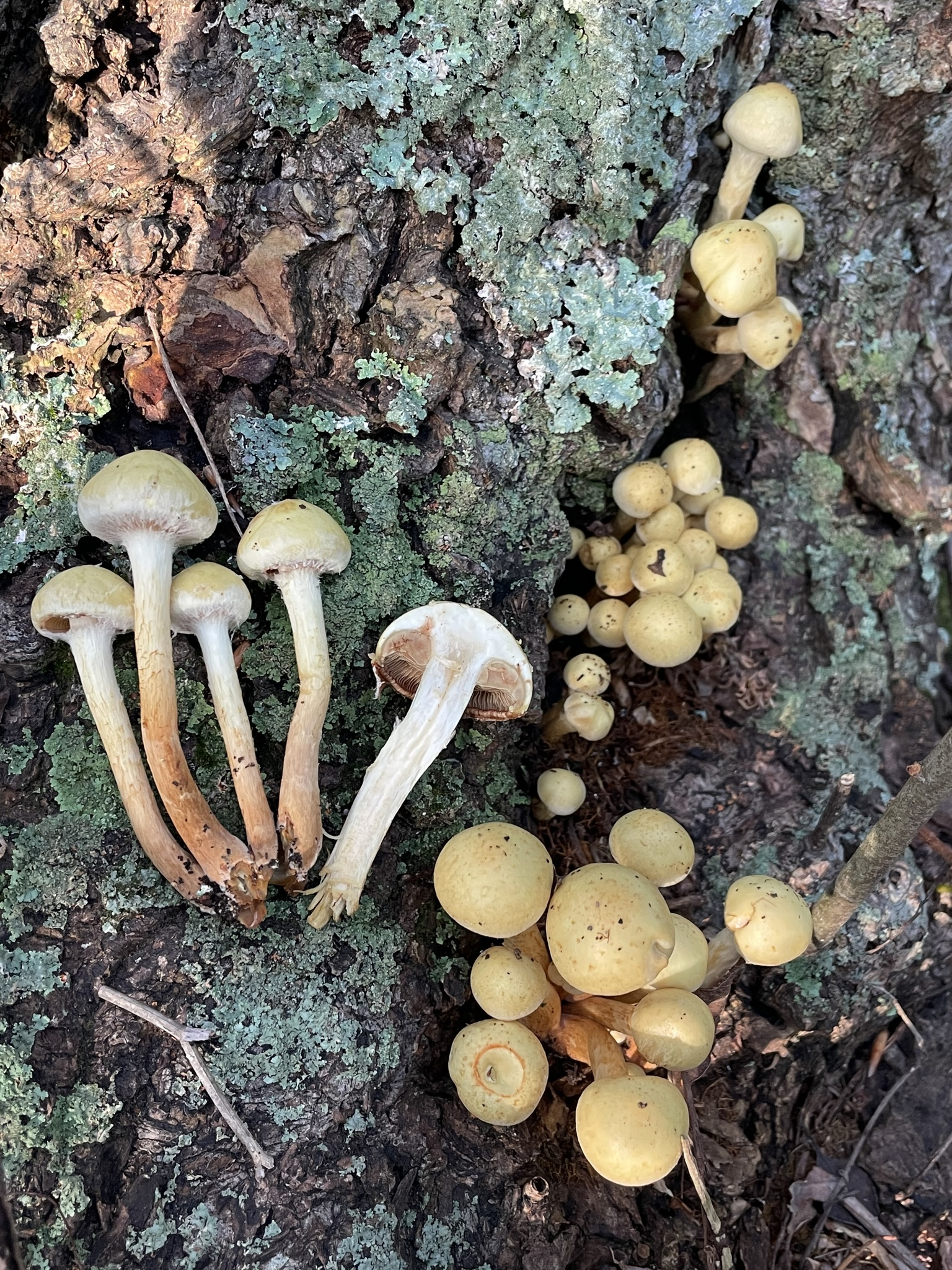

Scientific classification
- Kingdom: Fungi
- Division: Basidiomycota
- Class: Agaricomycetes
- Order: Agaricales
- Family: Hymenogastraceae
- Genus: Flammula
- Species: F. alnicola

Binomial name
- Flammula alnicola (Fr.) P. Kumm.

Synonyms
- Pholiota alnicola (Fr.) Singer

= Flammula alnicola =

Flammula alnicola Mycological characteristics
- Gills on hymenium
- Cap is conical or flat
- Hymenium is adnate
- Stipe is bare
- Spore print is brown
- Edibility is unknown

Flammula alnicola, also known as Pholiota alnicola, is a species of mushroom in the family Hymenogastraceae.

== Description ==
The cap of Flammula alnicola is about 3-8 centimeters in diameter. It starts out conical to convex, before becoming flat or umbonate. It is gold or yellow in color, and becomes darker as the mushroom matures. The stipe is about 4-8 cm long and sometimes has a ring zone. The gills start out pale yellowish, becoming reddish brown or orangish brown in age. The spore print is brown. Flammula alnicola has been reported to smell citrusy or indistinct, depending on the collection.

== Habitat and ecology ==
Flammula alnicola is a saprophytic fungus, that grows on rotting wood. It usually grows on alder wood, but it sometimes also grows on other hardwoods. Occasionally, it even grows on conifer wood, it is found in North America, Asia, and Europe.
