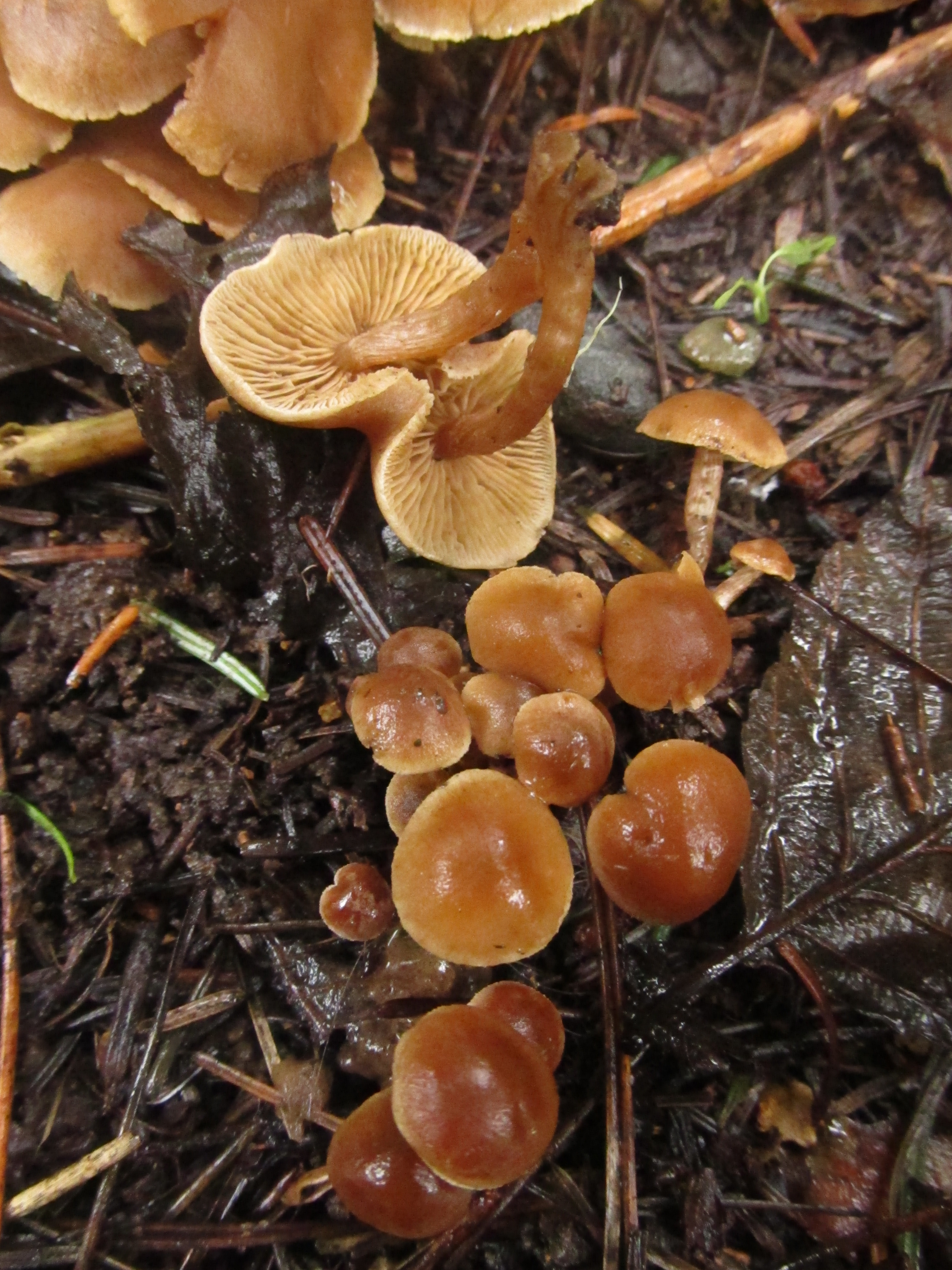
- Naucoria sp.

Scientific classification
- Kingdom: Fungi
- Division: Basidiomycota
- Class: Agaricomycetes
- Order: Agaricales
- Family: Hymenogastraceae
- Genus: Alnicola; Kühner (1926)

Type species
- Alnicola escharioides (Fr.) Romagn. 1944

Synonyms
- Naucoria (Fr.) P.Kumm. (1871)

= Alnicola =

Genus of fungi

Alnicola is a genus of fungi in the family Hymenogastraceae of the order Agaricales. The genus has a widespread distribution, and contains 60 species that usually form mycorrhizal relationships with species of Alder. The genus name is synonymous with Naucoria, with the correct genus being Alnicola according to the most recent taxonomic treatment.

== Species ==
- Alnicola alnetorum
- Alnicola amarescens
- Alnicola aurora
- Alnicola badia
- Alnicola bohemica
- Alnicola cerodes
- Alnicola clavuligeroides
- Alnicola escharioides
- Alnicola luteolofibrillosa
- Alnicola melinoides
- Alnicola salicetorum
- Alnicola salicis
- Alnicola scolecina
- Alnicola silvaenovae
- Alnicola spadicea
- Alnicola sphagneti
- Alnicola striatula
- Alnicola suavis
- Alnicola subconspersa
- Alnicola subglobosa
- Alnicola tantilla
