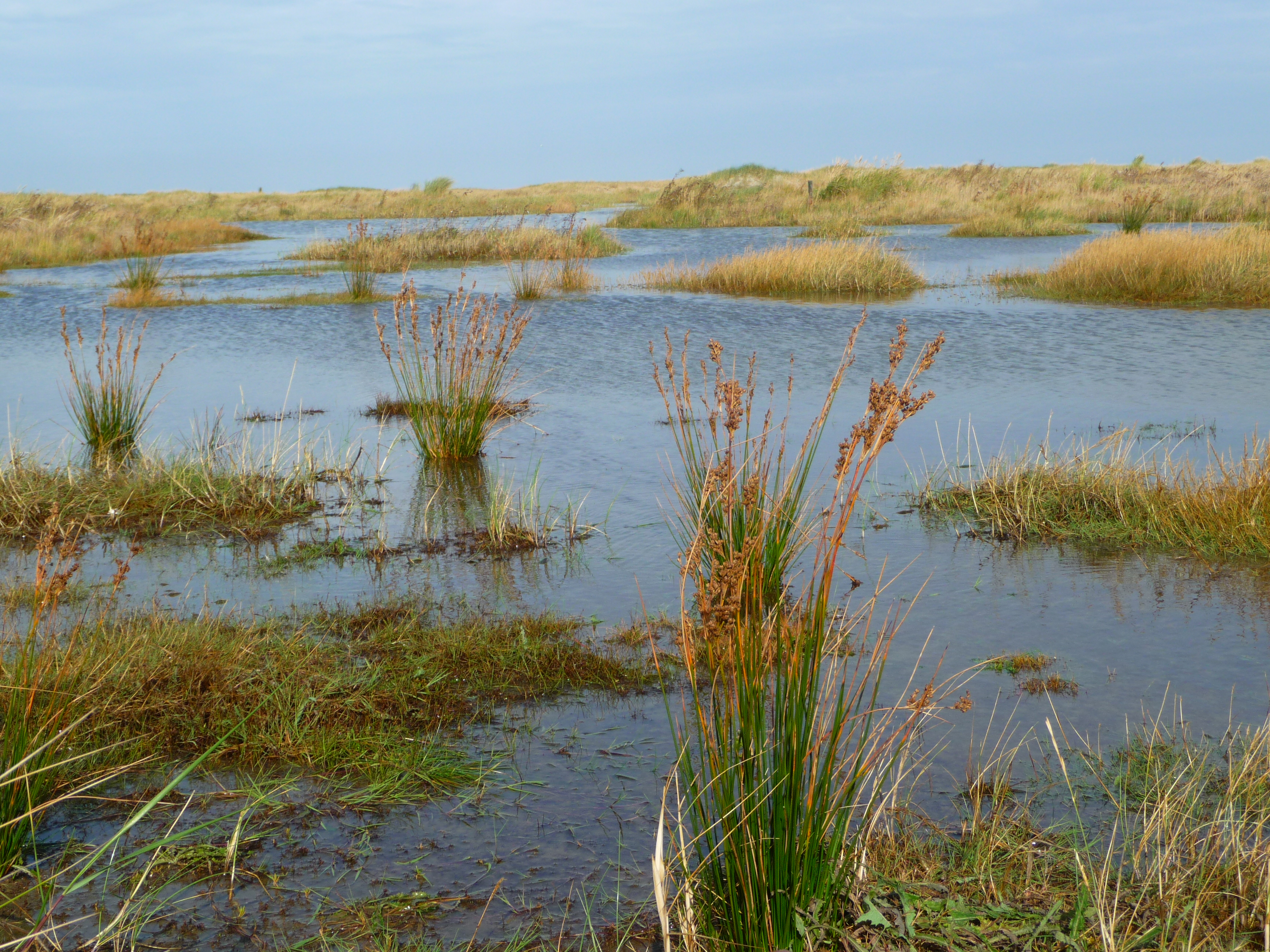

Scientific classification
- Kingdom: Plantae
- Clade: Tracheophytes
- Clade: Angiosperms
- Clade: Monocots
- Clade: Commelinids
- Order: Poales
- Family: Juncaceae
- Genus: Juncus
- Species: J. maritimus

Binomial name
- Juncus maritimus Lam.

= Juncus maritimus =

Species of rush

Juncus maritimus, known as the sea rush, is a species of rush that grows on coastlines. It is sometimes considered conspecific with Juncus kraussii. It has a wide distribution across the western Palearctic realm (all of Europe, western Asia and the Maghreb).

According to Edward Catich the ancient Egyptians used Juncus maritimus as a brush for writing. He describes the process of making one: “the end of which [the rush] was cut at a slant and its fibers split by chewing to produce a small chisel-shaped ‘brush‘.”.
