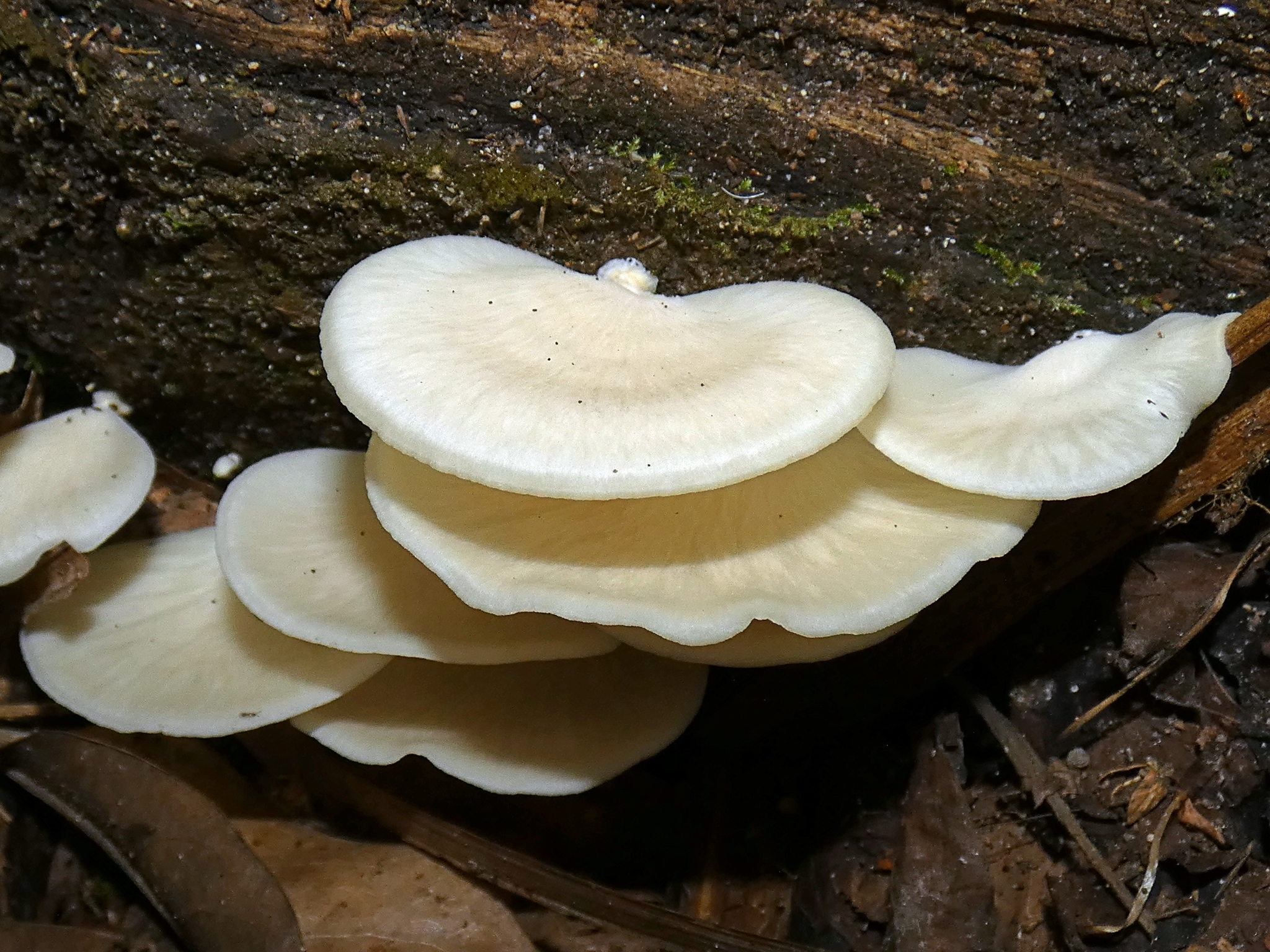

Scientific classification
- Domain: Eukaryota
- Kingdom: Fungi
- Division: Basidiomycota
- Class: Agaricomycetes
- Order: Polyporales
- Family: Polyporaceae
- Genus: Royoporus; A.B.De (1996)
- Species: R. spathulatus

Binomial name
- Royoporus spathulatus (Jungh.) A.B.De (1996)

Synonyms
- List: Laschia spatulata Jungh. (1838); Favolus spatulatus (Jungh.) Lév. (1844); Hymenogramme spatulata (Jungh.) Sacc. & Cub. (1887); Aschersonia spatulata (Jungh.) Kuntze (1898); Tyromyces spatulatus (Jungh.) G. Cunn. (1965); Polyporus spatulatus (Jungh.) Corner (1984); Favolus moluccensis Mont. (1843); Polyporus moluccensis (Mont.) Ryvarden (1990)

= Royoporus =

Royoporus spathulatus

Genus of fungi

Royoporus is a genus of fungi in the family Polyporaceae. It was circumscribed by mycologist Asit Baran De in 1996. The genus name honours Indian botanist Anjali Roy, (1930–2017), who worked at Visva-Bharati University in West Bengal. The genus is monotypic, being represented by the single species Royoporus spatulatus.

Former species;

- R. badius (Pers.) A.B. De (1997) = Picipes badius
- R. pseudobetulinus (Murashk. ex Pilát) A.B. De (1998) = Favolus pseudobetulinus
