= Gibberella bresadolae =

Scientific classification
- Domain: Eukaryota
- Kingdom: Fungi
- Division: Ascomycota
- Class: Sordariomycetes
- Order: Hypocreales
- Family: Nectriaceae
- Genus: Gibberella
- Species: G. bresadolae

Binomial name
- Gibberella bresadolae (Rick) L. Holm (1968)

Synonyms
- Gibberidea bresadolae Rick, Annls mycol. 5(1): 31 (1907)

Species of fungus

Gibberella bresadolae is a fungal plant pathogen.
