= Bisifusarium dimerum =

Scientific classification
- Domain: Eukaryota
- Kingdom: Fungi
- Division: Ascomycota
- Class: Sordariomycetes
- Order: Hypocreales
- Family: Nectriaceae
- Genus: Bisifusarium
- Species: B. dimerum

Binomial name
- Bisifusarium dimerum (Penz.) L. Lombard & Crous

Synonyms
- List: Fusarium dimerum Penz.; Fusarium dimerum var. dimerum; Microdochium dimerum (Penz.) Arx; Fusarium aquaeductuum var. dimerum (Penz.) Raillo; Fusarium dimerum var. violaceum Wollenw.; Fusarium pusillum Wollenw.; Fusarium dimerum var. pusillum (Wollenw.) Wollenw.; Fusarium dimerum var. majusculum Wollenw.; Fusarium baptisiae Henn.; Selenosporium aurantiacum Bonord.; Fusarium bonordenii Sacc.; Fusarium subnivale Höhn.; Fusisporium flavum Fr.; Fusarium flavum (Fr.) Wollenw.; Fusarium aquaeductuum var. flavum (Fr.) Raillo; Pionnotes flava (Fr.) Sacc.

Species of fungus

Bisifusarium dimerum is a species of fungus that shows promise as a biocontrol agent.

This fungus has potential to protect tomato plants against Botrytis cinerea (gray mold) infections. This fungus has the additional binomial Fusarium dimerum. It has also been found in human eye infections and has been found to be an inhibitory agent for nematodes.
