= Gibberella baccata =

Scientific classification
- Domain: Eukaryota
- Kingdom: Fungi
- Division: Ascomycota
- Class: Sordariomycetes
- Order: Hypocreales
- Family: Nectriaceae
- Genus: Gibberella
- Species: G. baccata

Binomial name
- Gibberella baccata (Wallr.) Sacc., Michelia 1(no. 3): 317 (1878)

Synonyms
- Botryosphaeria moricola Ces. & De Not., (1863); Fusarium lateritium Nees, (1817); Gibbera baccata (Wallroth) Saccardo; Gibberella baccata var. moricola (Ces. & De Not.) Wollenw., (1931); Gibberella lateritium W.C. Snyder & H.N. Hansen, (1945); Gibberella moricola (Ces. & De Not.) Sacc., (1878); Gibberella pulicaris subsp. baccata (Wallr.) Sacc., (1878); Sphaeria baccata Wallr., (1833) Fusarium stilboides

Fungus, plant disease

Gibberella baccata is a fungal plant pathogen. It is a common finding worldwide. It is common in soil and in woody plants, especially in tree tissues.

== Hosts ==
Hosts include Citrus spp., hardwood lumber trees, coffee, plum, apple (Malus spp.), and mulberry (Morus spp.).
