= Fusarium oxysporum f.sp. vasinfectum =

Scientific classification
- Domain: Eukaryota
- Kingdom: Fungi
- Division: Ascomycota
- Class: Sordariomycetes
- Order: Hypocreales
- Family: Nectriaceae
- Genus: Fusarium
- Species: F. oxysporum
- Forma specialis: F. o. f.sp. vasinfectum

Trionomial name
- Fusarium oxysporum f.sp. vasinfectum W.C. Snyder & H.N. Hansen, (1940)

Synonyms
- Fusarium oxysporum f. vasinfectum (G.F. Atk.) W.C. Snyder & H.N. Hansen, (1940); Fusarium vasinfectum G.F. Atk., (1892)

Fungal plant pathogen

Fusarium oxysporum f.sp. vasinfectum is a fungal plant pathogen.
