= Mildred K. Nobles =

Canadian mycologist

Mildred Katherine Nobles (7 June 1903 – 26 March 1993) was a Canadian mycologist. Born in Colborne, Northumberland County, Ontario, the only surviving child of William Harold and Ethel Nobles, she spent her early life at the family farm in Vernonville. She was an authority of the culture and identification of wood-rotting fungi, and developed a numerical identification system today known as the "Nobles Species Code". Nobles died in Ottawa, Ontario after a short illness. She was awarded the "Distinguished Mycologist" award, along with Rolf Singer, by the Mycological Society of America in 1986.

== Education ==
Mildred's family relocated to Regina Saskatchewan due to her father's poor health, where she attended public schools and the Collegiate Institute. She later taught in multigrade schools around Regina.

In the fall of 1927, Mildred entered Queen's University then later graduated in May 1929 with a B.A. (Honours) in Biology and Chemistry. She dreamt of working at the Central Experimental Farm in Ottawa so she applied for a summer student position. Initially, she was rejected during her interview due to being a woman however, she ended up getting hired later that day after being introduced to the mycologist Dr. Irene Mounce who advocated for her hire. Working for the summer under Dr. Mounce kicked off her career focus in mycology.

Mildred then attended graduate school at the University of Toronto. Her graduate studies were carried out under H.S. Jackson and her 1931 M.A. thesis was titled The fungus flora of some local soils. In 1935 she completed her Ph.D. after writing a dissertation on Conidial cycles in the Thelephoraceae.

== Career ==
Nobles' mycological career was spent with the Canadian Department of Agriculture in Ottawa. In 1935 she was appointed Assistant Botanist and Plant Pathologist, and by 1959 she became Principal Mycologist. Despite being born with spina bifida Nobles was not deterred from doing fieldwork and traveling.

Nobles undertook pioneering research in identifying wood-destroying fungi and was eventually established as a world authority in this field. In 1948 she published a manual for the identification of wood-destroying fungi based on their cultural characteristics. Each species had a numerical code known as Nobles' species code. This key and an identification service was used for investigations in forest management by Forest Pathologists across Canada and contributed to the solution of many decay problems.

During the 1940s and 1950s Nobles' lab was the centre for identification of cultured wood-destroying fungi for the Canadian Forestry Service. The goal was to determine the quantity and quality of wood decay occurring in forests across Canada.

In 1965 Nobles published a multiple choice key to replace her 1948 publication to further simplify the identification of wood decay fungi species. This publication alone has been cited in over 200 papers. During her career, she built and maintained over 3000 cultures of 600 different wood-destroying fungi species. She retired from the department in 1969. Nobles died March 26, 1993, after a brief illness.

== Honours and awards ==
Midred K. Nobles was elected Fellow of the Royal Society of Canada in 1963, awarded the George Lawson Medal in 1972 by the Canadian Botanical Association, and the Mycological Society of America awarded her the title Distinguished Mycologist in 1986.

== Publications ==
- Nobles MK. (1965). "Identification of cultures of wood-inhabiting Hymenomycetes". Canadian Journal of Botany. 43 (9): 1097–1139. Bibcode:1965CaJB...43.1097N. doi:10.1139/b65-126.
