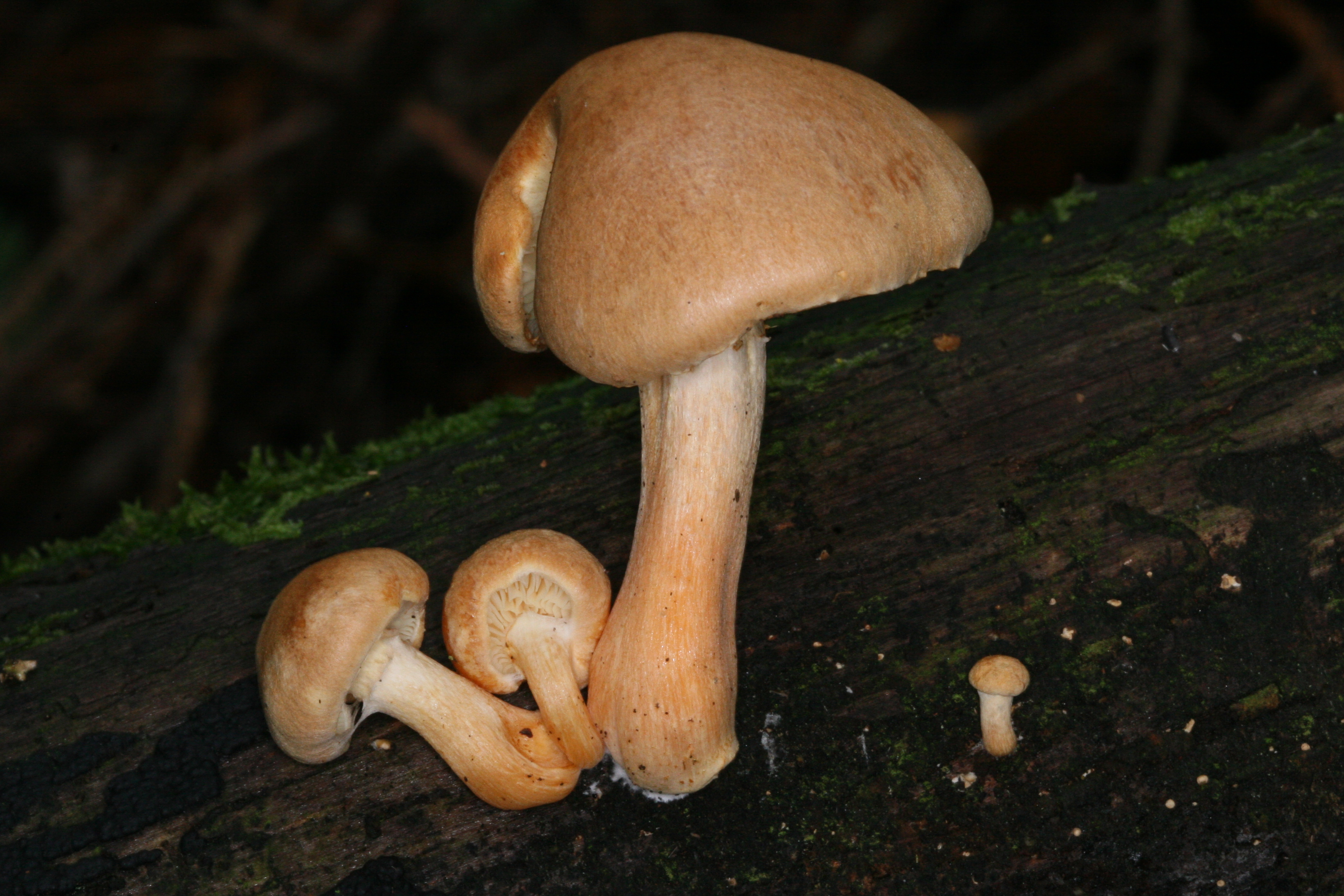

Scientific classification
- Domain: Eukaryota
- Kingdom: Fungi
- Division: Basidiomycota
- Class: Agaricomycetes
- Order: Agaricales
- Family: Hymenogastraceae
- Genus: Gymnopilus
- Species: G. hybridus

Binomial name
- Gymnopilus hybridus (Bull.) Maire (1933)

Synonyms
- Agaricus hybridus Bull. (1789); Flammula hybrida (Bull.) Gillet (1876); Fulvidula hybrida (Bull.) Singer (1937); Gymnopilus penetrans var. hybridus (Bull.) P.Roux & Guy (2006)

= Gymnopilus hybridus =

Species of fungus

Gymnopilus hybridus Mycological characteristics
- Gills on hymenium
- Cap is convex
- Hymenium is adnexed or adnate
- Ecology is saprotrophic

Gymnopilus hybridus is a species of agaric fungus in the family Hymenogastraceae.

== See also ==
- List of Gymnopilus species
