= Fungerin =

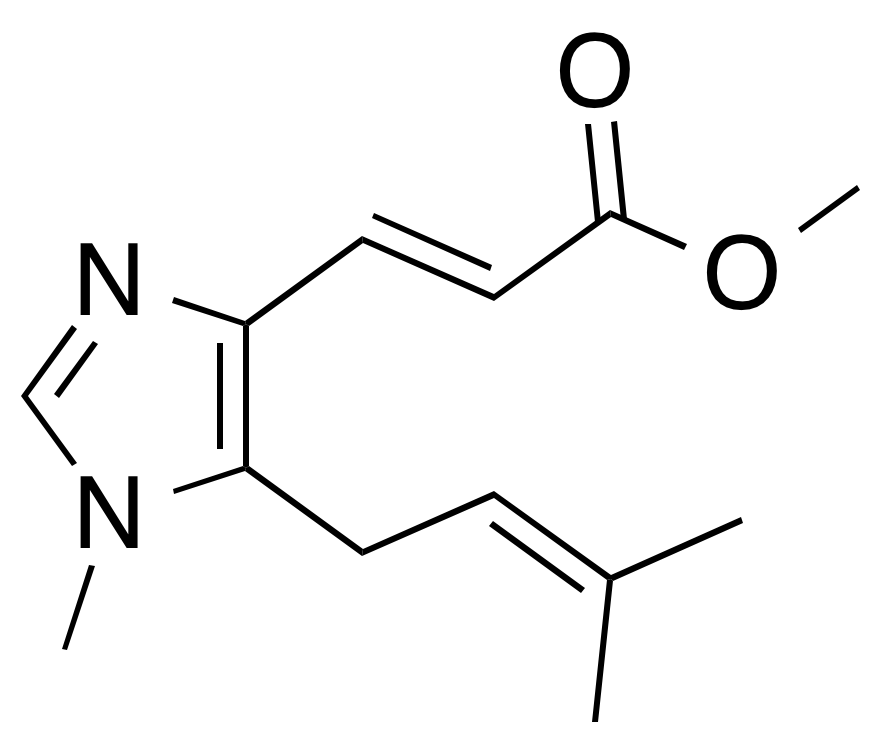

Names
- IUPAC name Methyl (E)-3-[1-methyl-5-(3-methylbut-2-enyl)imidazol-4-yl]prop-2-enoate
- Other names: Fungerin; Methyl (2E)-3-[1-methyl-5-(3-methyl-2-buten-1-yl)-1H-imidazol-4-yl]acrylate

Identifiers
| CAS Number | 185681-81-6 |
| 3D model (JSmol) | Interactive image |
| ChemSpider | 8258312 |
| PubChem CID | 10082774 |
- InChI: InChI=1S/C13H18N2O2/c1-10(2)5-7-12-11(14-9-15(12)3)6-8-13(16)17-4/h5-6,8-9H,7H2,1-4H3/b8-6+ Key: LLJZWVUHEIKSRC-SOFGYWHQSA-N
- SMILES: CC(=CCC1=C(N=CN1C)/C=C/C(=O)OC)C

Properties
| Chemical formula | C_{13}H_{18}N_{2}O_{2} |
| Molar mass | 234.299 g·mol^{−1} |
- Except where otherwise noted, data are given for materials in their standard state (at 25 °C [77 °F], 100 kPa). Infobox references

Fungerin is an antifungal alkaloid with the molecular formula C_{13}H_{18}N_{2}O_{2} which is produced by Fusarium species.
