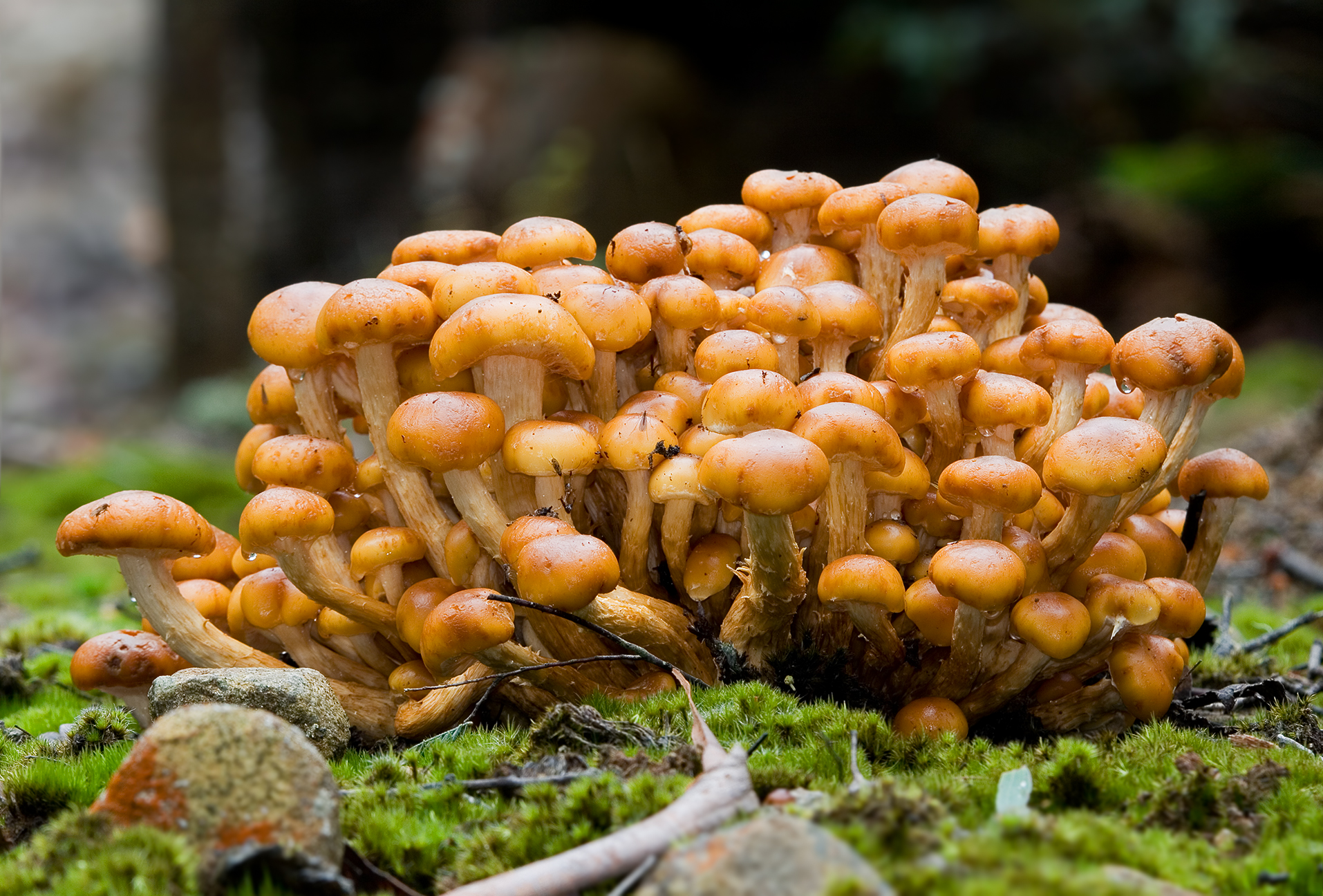
- Flammula malicola in Meander Forest Reserve, Tasmania, Australia

Scientific classification
- Kingdom: Fungi
- Division: Basidiomycota
- Class: Agaricomycetes
- Order: Agaricales
- Family: Hymenogastraceae
- Genus: Flammula (Fr.) P. Kumm. (1871)

Type species
- Flammula flavida (Schaeff.:Fr.) P. Kumm.)(1871)

Species
- Flammula alnicola; Flammula flavida; Flammula malicola

= Flammula =

Genus of fungi

Flammula is a dark brown-spored genus of mushrooms that cause a decay of trees, on whose bases they often fruit, forming clusters of yellowish brown mushrooms.

== Taxonomy ==
For nearly a century, Flammula was considered to be a synonym of Pholiota, a mushroom genus in the Strophariaceae. Molecular analysis placed it outside of the Strophariaceae and specifically in the Hymenogastraceae. As a distinct genus, the name Flammula is currently used.
