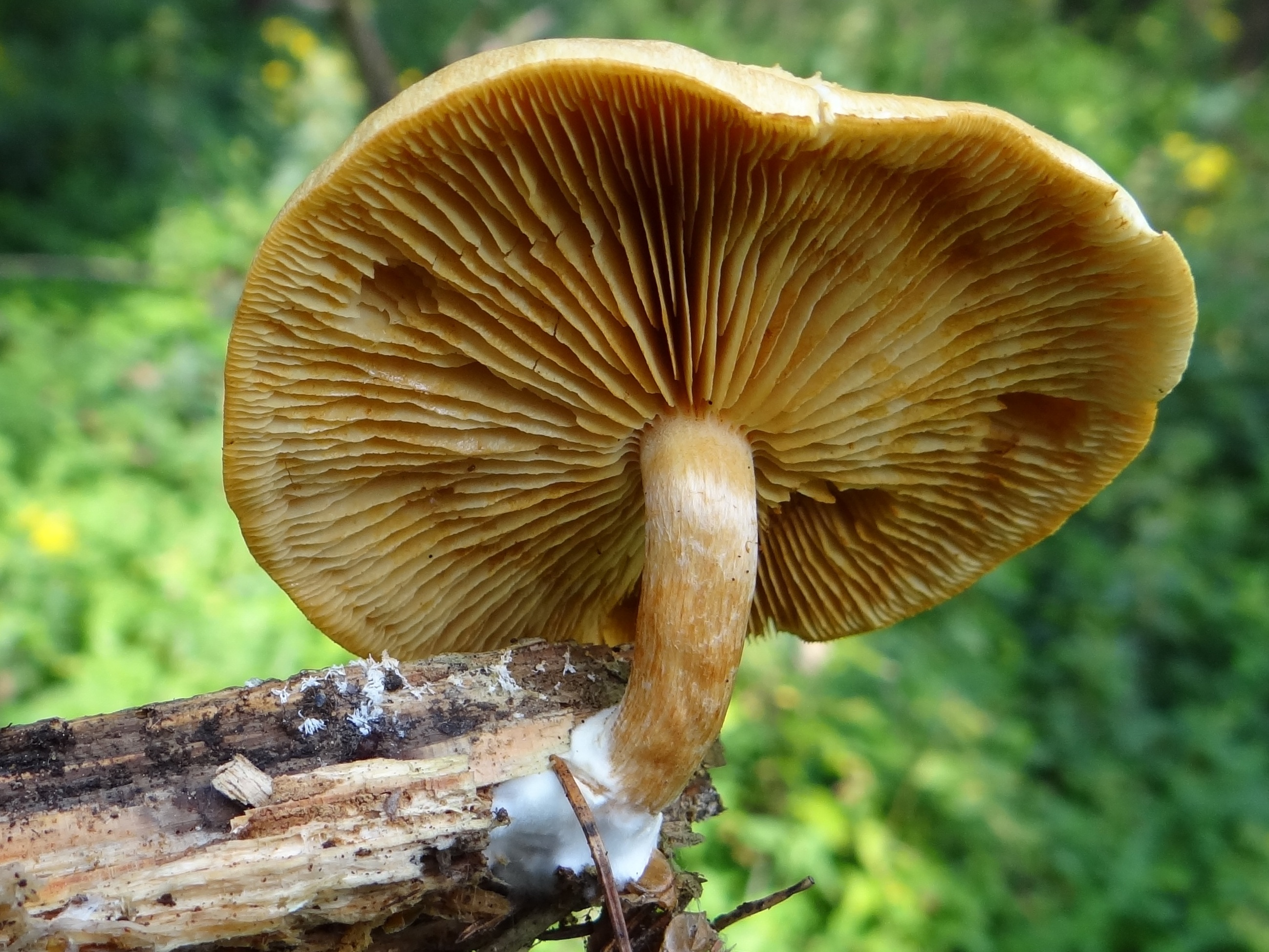
- Gymnopilus penetrans

Scientific classification
- Kingdom: Fungi
- Division: Basidiomycota
- Class: Agaricomycetes
- Order: Agaricales
- Family: Hymenogastraceae; Vittad. (1831)

Type genus
- Hymenogaster Vittad. (1831)

Genera
- see text

= Hymenogastraceae =

Family of fungi

The Hymenogastraceae is a family of fungi in the order Agaricales with both agaric and false-truffle shaped fruitbodies. Formerly, prior to molecular analyses, the family was restricted to the false-truffle genera. The mushroom genus Psilocybe in the Hymenogastraceae is now restricted to the hallucinogenic species while nonhallucinogenic former species are largely in the genus Deconica classified in the Strophariaceae.

One of the two known species of Wakefieldia has been found recently to belong to this family but formal transfer cannot be made until the phylogeny of the type species of the genus is resolved. Psathyloma, added to the family in 2016, was circumscribed to contain two agarics found in New Zealand.

== Genera ==
- Alnicola (12 species)
- Dendrogaster (1 species)
- Flammula (113 species)
- Galera (4 species)
- Galerina (307 species)
- Galerula (3 species)
- Gymnopilus (209 species)
- Hebeloma (355 species)
- Hymenogaster (79 species)
- Naematoloma (13 species)
- Naucoria (177 species)
- Phaeocollybia (88 species)
- Psathyloma (3 species)
- Pseudohelicomyces (1 species)
- Psilocybe (310 species)
- Rhizopogoniella (1 species)
- Velomycena (1 species)
