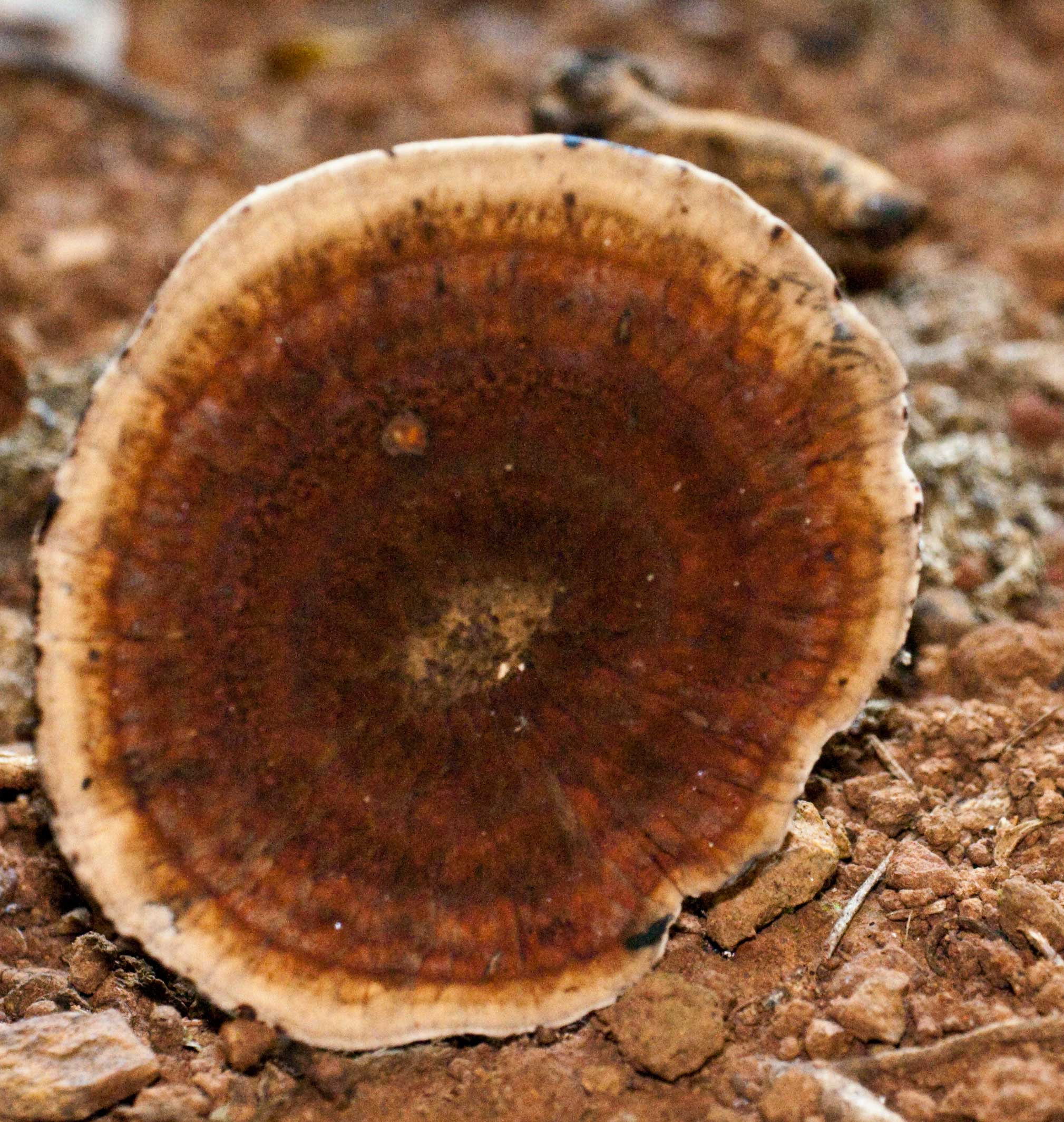

Scientific classification
- Domain: Eukaryota
- Kingdom: Fungi
- Division: Basidiomycota
- Class: Agaricomycetes
- Order: Polyporales
- Family: Ganodermataceae
- Genus: Amauroderma
- Species: A. rude

Binomial name
- Amauroderma rude (Berk.) Torrend (1920)

Synonyms
- Fomes rudis Berk. (1885)

= Amauroderma rude =

Species of fungus

Amauroderma rude Mycological characteristics
- Pores on hymenium
- Cap is flat or depressed
- Hymenium attachment is not applicable
- Stipe is bare
- Spore print is brown
- Ecology is saprotrophic
- Edibility is unknown or inedible

Amauroderma rude is a tough woody mushroom in the family Ganodermataceae. A polypore fungus, it is found in Eastern Australia, where it grows as a saprophyte on rotting, buried wood.

== Etymology ==
Amauroderma means "dark/dusky-skinned" (from amauro, meaning "dark or dusky", and derma, meaning "skin"). The second half of the binomen, rude, means "robust".

== Description ==
Fruit bodies have caps that are typically 4–8 cm (1.6–3.1 in) wide with alternating bands of light and dark brown rings. On the cap underside are small white to pale grey pores that initially turn red when bruised before turning black; this red-staining behaviour is unique in its genus. The light to dark brown stipe measures 5–13 cm (2.0–5.1 in) long by 1–2 cm (0.4–0.8 in) thick.
