= Amauroderma auriscalpium =

Scientific classification
- Kingdom: Fungi
- Division: Basidiomycota
- Class: Agaricomycetes
- Order: Polyporales
- Family: Ganodermataceae
- Genus: Amauroderma
- Species: A. auriscalpium

Binomial name
- Amauroderma auriscalpium (Pers.) Torrend (1920)

Synonyms
- Polyporus auriscalpium Pers. (1827)

Species of fungus

Amauroderma auriscalpium is a species of stipitate polypore fungus in the family Ganodermataceae.

== Taxonomy ==
The fungus was first described in 1827 by the mycologist Christiaan Hendrik Persoon under the name Polyporus auriscalpium, based on specimens collected in Rio de Janeiro, Brazil. In 1920, the Portuguese mycologist Camille Torrend transferred the species to the genus Amauroderma.
