= Amauroderma calcigenum =

Scientific classification
- Domain: Eukaryota
- Kingdom: Fungi
- Division: Basidiomycota
- Class: Agaricomycetes
- Order: Polyporales
- Family: Ganodermataceae
- Genus: Amauroderma
- Species: A. calcigenum

Binomial name
- Amauroderma calcigenum (Berk.) Torrend (1920)

Synonyms
- Polyporus calcigenus Berk. (1843)

Species of fungus

Amauroderma calcigenum is a polypore fungus in the family Ganodermataceae. It was first described as a species of Polyporus by Miles Joseph Berkeley in 1843. Camille Torrend transferred it to genus Amauroderma in 1920. A. calcigenum is found in Brazil, Guyana, and Venezuela.
