= Amauroderma aurantiacum =

Scientific classification
- Domain: Eukaryota
- Kingdom: Fungi
- Division: Basidiomycota
- Class: Agaricomycetes
- Order: Polyporales
- Family: Ganodermataceae
- Genus: Amauroderma
- Species: A. aurantiacum

Binomial name
- Amauroderma aurantiacum (Torrend) Gibertoni & Bernicchia (2008)

Synonyms
- Ganoderma aurantiacum Torrend (1932); Amauroderma macrosporum J.S.Furtado (1968)

Species of fungus

Amauroderma aurantiacum is a polypore fungus in the family Ganodermataceae. It was first described as a species of Ganoderma by Portuguese botanist Camille Torrend in 1932. Tatiana Gibertoni and Annarosa Bernicchia transferred it to Amauroderma in 2008. A. aurantiacum is found in Brazil and Venezuela.
