= Amauroderma calcitum =

Scientific classification
- Kingdom: Fungi
- Division: Basidiomycota
- Class: Agaricomycetes
- Order: Polyporales
- Family: Ganodermataceae
- Genus: Amauroderma
- Species: A. calcitum

Binomial name
- Amauroderma calcitum D.H.Costa Rezende & E.R.Drechsler-Santos (2016) – Brazil

Species of fungus

Amauroderma calcitum is a tough woody mushroom in the family Ganodermataceae. It is a polypore fungus found in Brazil.
