= Ganoderma microsporum immunomodulatory protein =

Fungal protein

Identifiers
- Symbol: GMI
- Pfam: PF09259
- InterPro: IPR015339
Available protein structures:
- PDB: 3KCW IPR015339 PF09259 (ECOD; PDBsum)
- AlphaFold: IPR015339; PF09259

Ganoderma microsporum immunomodulatory protein or GMI is a protein discovered from the mushroom species Ganoderma microsporum. GMI is a pure protein composed of 111 amino acids and exists in nature as a tetramer.

== Discovery ==
GMI is found in the mycelium of Ganoderma microsporum. During the life cycle of G. microsporum, GMI acts as an important signaling factor in the transition from the fungi's mycelium phase to the fruiting body phase. However, the levels of GMI found in both the mycelium and fruiting body are very low.

In 2005, researchers utilized genetic and bio-engineering methods to obtain purified GMI, and proved that the protein is structurally similar to LZ-8, the first fungal immunomodulatory protein discovered in 1989. The name GMI is derived from the fact that when cultured with immune cells, GMI was found to not only increase the cells' hormone production, but also induce higher levels of cellular activity.

== Immunomodulatory functions ==
GMI has been observed to exhibit a variety of antitumor properties, including inhibition of cancer cell proliferation, tumor suppression, and enhancement of autophagy and apoptosis, all of which are driven mainly through induction of epidermal growth factor receptor (EGFR) degradation. Its ability to modulate immune responses has also provoked an interest in studying its possible antiviral properties and therapeutic potential. Recently, GMI was observed to interfere with SARS-CoV-2 infection by blocking viral attachment and membrane fusion through binding the viral spike protein as well as the host ACE2 receptor. GMI also inhibits SARS-CoV-2 pro-inflammatory mediators, which are key drivers of hyper-inflammatory responses associated with severe COVID-19 and can contribute to severe tissue injury and multi-organ damage. Beyond coronaviruses, GMI has shown inhibitory effects against several herpesviruses, including Epstein-Barr virus (EBV) and Herpes simplex virus 1 (HSV-1). GMI inhibits herpesvirus infection by disrupting membrane fusion during viral entry, primarily through binding to the widely conserved glycoprotein gB. These observations suggest that GMI could have broad-spectrum antiviral properties, although all current observations derive from in vitro studies and require confirmation in vivo.
