= Amauroderma africana =

Scientific classification
- Domain: Eukaryota
- Kingdom: Fungi
- Division: Basidiomycota
- Class: Agaricomycetes
- Order: Polyporales
- Family: Ganodermataceae
- Genus: Amauroderma
- Species: A. africana

Binomial name
- Amauroderma africana Ryvarden (2004)

Species of fungus

Amauroderma africana is a tough woody mushroom in the family Ganodermataceae. It is a polypore fungus.
