= Amauroderma sessile =

Scientific classification
- Kingdom: Fungi
- Division: Basidiomycota
- Class: Agaricomycetes
- Order: Polyporales
- Family: Ganodermataceae
- Genus: Amauroderma
- Species: A. sessile

Binomial name
- Amauroderma sessile A.C.Gomes-Silva, Ryvarden & T.B.Gibertoni (2015)

Species of fungus

Amauroderma sessile is a polypore fungus in the family Ganodermataceae. It was described as a new species in 2015 by mycologists Allyne Christina Gomes-Silva, Leif Ryvarden, and Tatiana Gibertoni. The specific epithet sessile (from the Latin word sessilis = without a stipe) refers to the characteristic stipe-free fruit body. A. sessile is found in the states of Amazonas, Mato Grosso, and Pará in the Brazilian Amazon.
