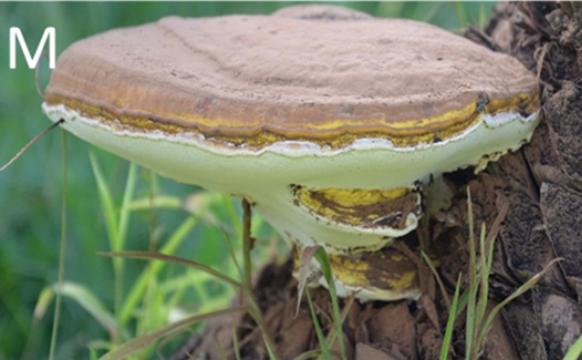
- Tomophagus colossus fruiting on the cycad Macrozamia moorei in Florida

Scientific classification
- Domain: Eukaryota
- Kingdom: Fungi
- Division: Basidiomycota
- Class: Agaricomycetes
- Order: Polyporales
- Family: Ganodermataceae
- Genus: Ganoderma
- Species: G. colossus

Binomial name
- Ganoderma colossus (Fr.) CF Baker, 1918

Synonyms
- Tomophagus colossus (Fr.) Murrill 1905; Dendrophagus colossus (Fr.) Murrill 1905; Polyporus hollandii Massee 1901; Polyporus colossus Fr. 1851

= Ganoderma colossus =

Species of fungus

Ganoderma colossus is a Basidiomycete bracket-fungus species in the family Ganodermataceae, previously placed in the genus Tomophagus. Records are from central and southern America and equatorial Africa (see GBIF); no subspecies are listed in the Catalogue of Life.
