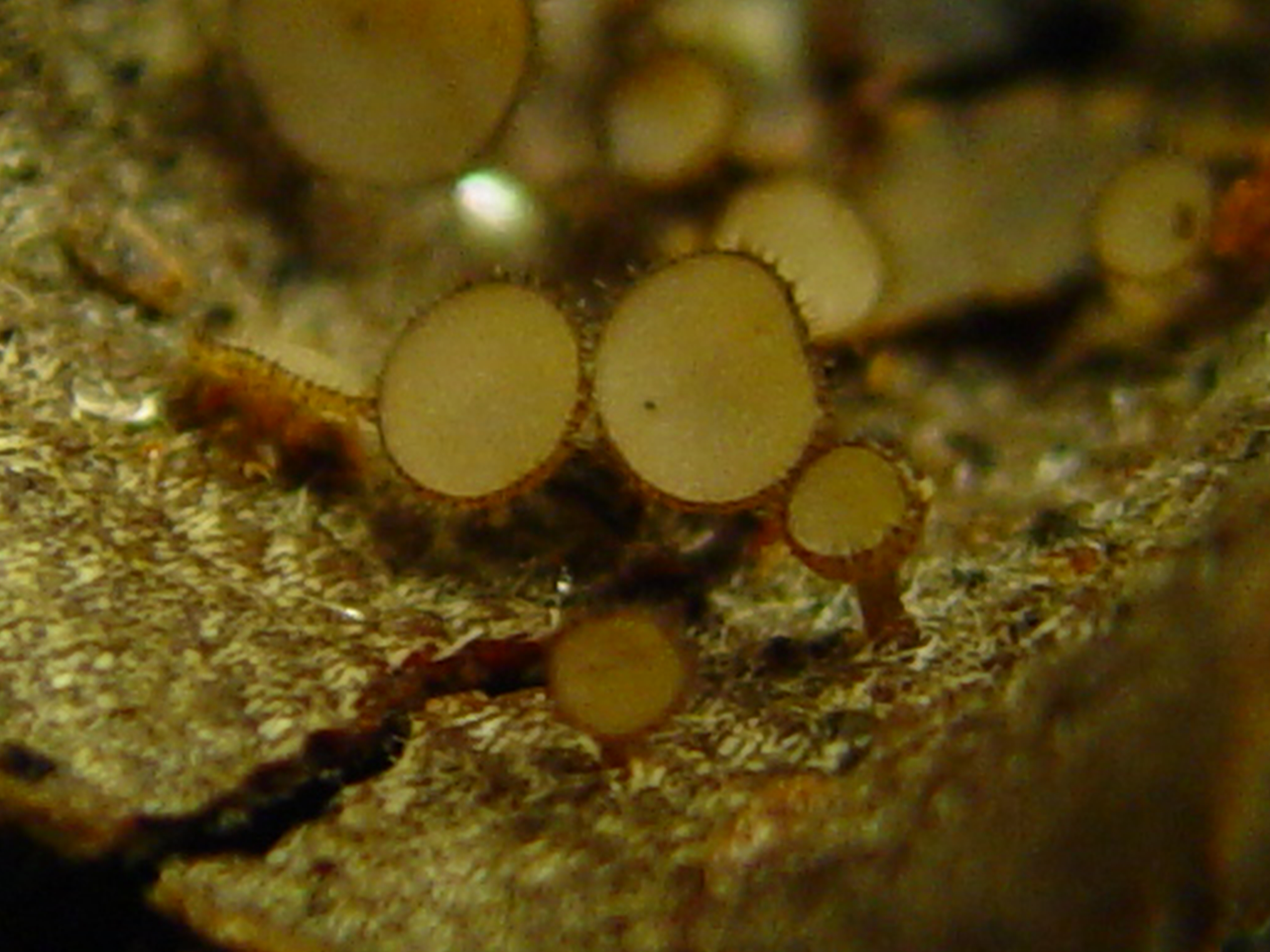
- Torrendiella ciliata

Scientific classification
- Kingdom: Fungi
- Division: Ascomycota
- Class: Leotiomycetes
- Order: Helotiales
- Family: Sclerotiniaceae
- Genus: Torrendiella; Boud. & Torr. (1911)

Type species
- Torrendiella ciliata Boud. (1911)

Synonyms
- Zoellneria Velen. (1934)

= Torrendiella =

Genus of fungi

Torrendiella is a genus of fungi in the family Sclerotiniaceae. It was circumscribed by Jean Louis Émile Boudier and John Torrey in Bull. Soc. Mycol. France vol.27 on page 133 in 1911, with Torrendiella ciliata as the type species. Several species once placed in this genus were transferred to Hymenotorrendiella in 2014.

The genus name of Torrendiella is in honour of Camille Torrend (1875-1961), who was a Portuguese clergyman and mycologist. He was active in France, Portugal, Ireland and Brazil. He was also a professor of botany and phytopathology at the Imperial Agricultural School of Bahia.

== Species ==
- Torrendiella ciliata Boud. (1911)
- Torrendiella quintocentenaria R. Galán & J.T. Palmer (1993)
- Torrendiella setulata (Dearn. & House) R. Galán & J.T. Palmer (1993)

Former species;

- T. andina P.R. Johnst. & Gamundí (2000) = Hymenotorrendiella andina, Helotiaceae
- T. brevisetosa P.R. Johnst. & Gamundí (2000) = Hymenotorrendiella brevisetosa, Helotiaceae
- T. cannibalensis P.R. Johnst. & Gamundí (2000) = Hymenotorrendiella cannibalensis, Helotiaceae
- T. clelandii (Hansf.) Spooner (1987) = Hymenotorrendiella clelandii, Helotiaceae
- T. dingleyae P.R. Johnst. & Gamundí (2000) = Hymenotorrendiella dingleyae, Helotiaceae
- T. eucalypti (Berk.) Spooner (1987) = Hymenotorrendiella eucalypti, Helotiaceae
- T. grisea P.R. Johnst. & Gamundí (2000) = Hymenotorrendiella grisea, Helotiaceae
- T. guangxiensis W.Y. Zhuang (1999) = Hymenotorrendiella guangxiensis, Helotiaceae
- T. madsenii (G.W. Beaton & Weste) Spooner (1987) = Hymenotorrendiella madsenii, Helotiaceae
