= Amauroderma ovisporum =

Scientific classification
- Domain: Eukaryota
- Kingdom: Fungi
- Division: Basidiomycota
- Class: Agaricomycetes
- Order: Polyporales
- Family: Ganodermataceae
- Genus: Amauroderma
- Species: A. ovisporum

Binomial name
- Amauroderma ovisporum A.C.Gomes-Silva, Ryvarden & T.B.Gibertoni (2015)

Species of fungus

Amauroderma ovisporum is a polypore fungus in the family Ganodermataceae. It was described as a new species in 2015 by mycologists Allyne Christina Gomes-Silva, Leif Ryvarden, and Tatiana Gibertoni. The specific epithet ovisporum (from the Latin words ovi = "egg" and spora = "spore") refers to the ovoid shape of the basidiospores. A. ovisporum is found in the states of Pará and Rondônia in the Brazilian Amazon.
