= Fungal immunomodulatory protein =

Functional compound found in fungi

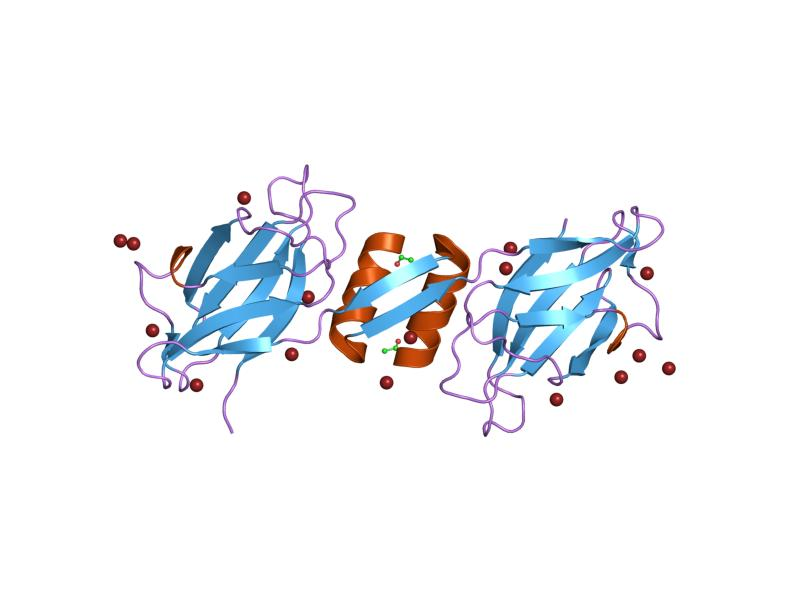
- molecular structure of FIP-fve PDB: 1OSY

Identifiers
- Symbol: FIP
- Pfam: PF09259
- InterPro: IPR015339
Available protein structures:
- PDB: 1OSY 3F3H 3KCW IPR015339 PF09259 (ECOD; PDBsum)
- AlphaFold: IPR015339; PF09259

Fungal immunomodulatory proteins (FIPs) are a type of functional compound (other compounds include polysaccharides and triterpenoids) found in various species of fungi. FIPs are part of the immunoglobulin (ig) family, which are structurally similar to human antibodies, and can interact with human peripheral blood mononuclear cells (PBMCs), causing these cells to secrete different types of hormones and regulate cellular activity.

== History ==
The first FIP was discovered in 1989 by Japanese scientist Kohsuke Kino et al. from the water extract of the mycelium of Ganoderma lucidum, and was named Ling Zhi-8 (LZ-8).

From then on, researchers have identified numerous structurally similar proteins from various types of fungi that also share a high degree of genetic similarity as well as physiological activities, and thus coined the term fungal immunomodulatory protein (FIP).

== Members of the FIP family ==
Currently known FIPs are listed below:

- LZ-8 from G. lucidum
- LZ-9 from G. lucidum
- FIP-gts from G. tsugae
- FIP-gsi (NCBI DNA Accession number AY987805; Protein Accession number AAX98241) from G. sinensis
- GMI (FIP-gmi) (NCBI GI Accession number 310942694; Protein Data Bank Accession number 3KCW_A) from G. microsporum
- FIP-tve (NCBI DNA Accession number XM_008037967; Protein Accession number XP_008036158) from Trametes versicolor
- FIP-pcp from Poria cocos
- FIP-fve (NCBI DNA Accession number GU388420; Protein Accession number ADB24832) from Flammulina velutipes
- FIP-vvo from Volvariella volvacea
- FIP-aca from Antrodia camphorate
- FIP-lrh from Lignosus rhinocerotis
