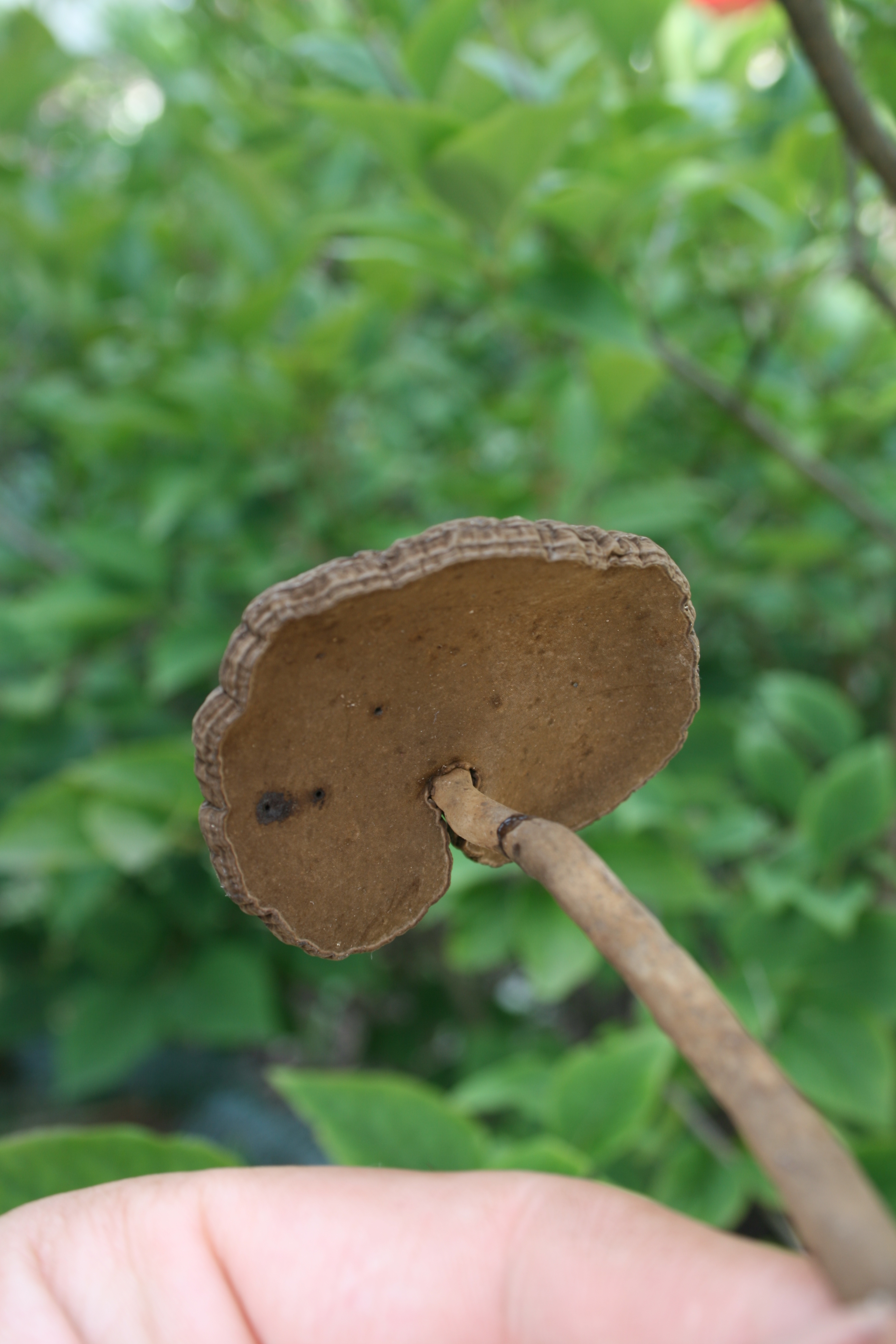

Scientific classification
- Domain: Eukaryota
- Kingdom: Fungi
- Division: Basidiomycota
- Class: Agaricomycetes
- Order: Polyporales
- Family: Ganodermataceae
- Genus: Amauroderma
- Species: A. rugosum

Binomial name
- Amauroderma rugosum (Blume & T.Nees) Torrend (1920)

= Amauroderma rugosum =

Species of fungus

Amauroderma rugosum Mycological characteristics
- Pores on hymenium
- Cap is flat or depressed
- Hymenium is subdecurrent
- Stipe is bare
- Spore print is brown
- Ecology is saprotrophic
- Edibility is unknown or inedible

Amauroderma rugosum is a tough woody mushroom in the family Ganodermataceae. It is a polypore fungus.

== Description ==
The hymenium of this fungus is white. It turns red when scratched.

== Distribution and habitat ==
Amauroderma rugosum is found in China, Indonesia, Taiwan, Equatorial Guinea, and Australia.
