= Amauroderma laccatostiptatum =

Scientific classification
- Domain: Eukaryota
- Kingdom: Fungi
- Division: Basidiomycota
- Class: Agaricomycetes
- Order: Polyporales
- Family: Ganodermataceae
- Genus: Amauroderma
- Species: A. laccatostiptatum

Binomial name
- Amauroderma laccatostiptatum A.C.Gomes-Silva, Ryvarden & T.B.Gibertoni (2015)

Species of fungus

Amauroderma laccatostiptatum is a polypore fungus in the family Ganodermataceae. It was described as a new species in 2015 by mycologists Allyne Christina Gomes-Silva, Leif Ryvarden, and Tatiana Gibertoni. The specific epithet laccatostiptatum (from the Latin words laccatus = "appearing varnished" and stipitatum = "with a stipe") refers to the varnished stipe. A. laccatostiptatum is found in the states of Amazonas, Pará, and Rondônia in the Brazilian Amazon. The fungus fruits on soil.
