= Amauroderma kwiluense =

Scientific classification
- Domain: Eukaryota
- Kingdom: Fungi
- Division: Basidiomycota
- Class: Agaricomycetes
- Order: Polyporales
- Family: Ganodermataceae
- Genus: Amauroderma
- Species: A. kwiluense

Binomial name
- Amauroderma kwiluense (Beeli) Ryvarden (1974)

Species of fungus

Amauroderma kwiluense is a tough woody mushroom in the family Ganodermataceae. It is a polypore fungus.
