= Amauroderma floriformum =

Scientific classification
- Domain: Eukaryota
- Kingdom: Fungi
- Division: Basidiomycota
- Class: Agaricomycetes
- Order: Polyporales
- Family: Ganodermataceae
- Genus: Amauroderma
- Species: A. floriformum

Binomial name
- Amauroderma floriformum A.C.Gomes-Silva, Ryvarden & T.B.Gibertoni (2015)

Species of fungus

Amauroderma floriformum is a polypore fungus in the family Ganodermataceae. It was described as a new species in 2015 by mycologists Allyne Christina Gomes-Silva, Leif Ryvarden, and Tatiana Gibertoni. The specific epithet floriformum (from the Latin words flos = flower and forma = shape) refers to the flower-shaped fruit body. A. floriformum is found in the state of Pará, in the Brazilian Amazon.
