= Amauroderma deviatum =

Scientific classification
- Kingdom: Fungi
- Division: Basidiomycota
- Class: Agaricomycetes
- Order: Polyporales
- Family: Ganodermataceae
- Genus: Amauroderma
- Species: A. deviatum

Binomial name
- Amauroderma deviatum Ryvarden (2004)

Species of fungus

Amauroderma deviatum is a tough woody mushroom in the family Ganodermataceae. It is a polypore fungus.
