= Amauroderma albostipitatum =

Scientific classification
- Domain: Eukaryota
- Kingdom: Fungi
- Division: Basidiomycota
- Class: Agaricomycetes
- Order: Polyporales
- Family: Ganodermataceae
- Genus: Amauroderma
- Species: A. albostipitatum

Binomial name
- Amauroderma albostipitatum A.C.Gomes-Silva, Ryvarden & T.B.Gibertoni (2015)

Species of fungus

Amauroderma albostipitatum is a polypore fungus in the family Ganodermataceae. It was described as a new species in 2015 by mycologists Allyne Christina Gomes-Silva, Leif Ryvarden, and Tatiana Gibertoni. The specific epithet albostipitatum refers to the characteristic whitish stipe. A. albostipitatum is found in the states of Rondônia and Roraima, in the Brazilian Amazon. It fruits on soil.
