= Amauroderma subsessile =

Scientific classification
- Domain: Eukaryota
- Kingdom: Fungi
- Division: Basidiomycota
- Class: Agaricomycetes
- Order: Polyporales
- Family: Ganodermataceae
- Genus: Amauroderma
- Species: A. subsessile

Binomial name
- Amauroderma subsessile A.C.Gomes-Silva, Ryvarden & T.B.Gibertoni (2015)

Species of fungus

Amauroderma subsessile is a polypore fungus in the family Ganodermataceae. It was described as a new species in 2015 by mycologists Allyne Christina Gomes-Silva, Leif Ryvarden, and Tatiana Gibertoni. The specific epithet subsessile (from the Latin words sub "somewhat" and sessilis = "without a stipe") refers to "the basidiomata not completely sessile, with a short to long stipe". A. subsessile is found in the states of Rondônia and Pará in the Brazilian Amazon, as well as Costa Rica and Panama.
