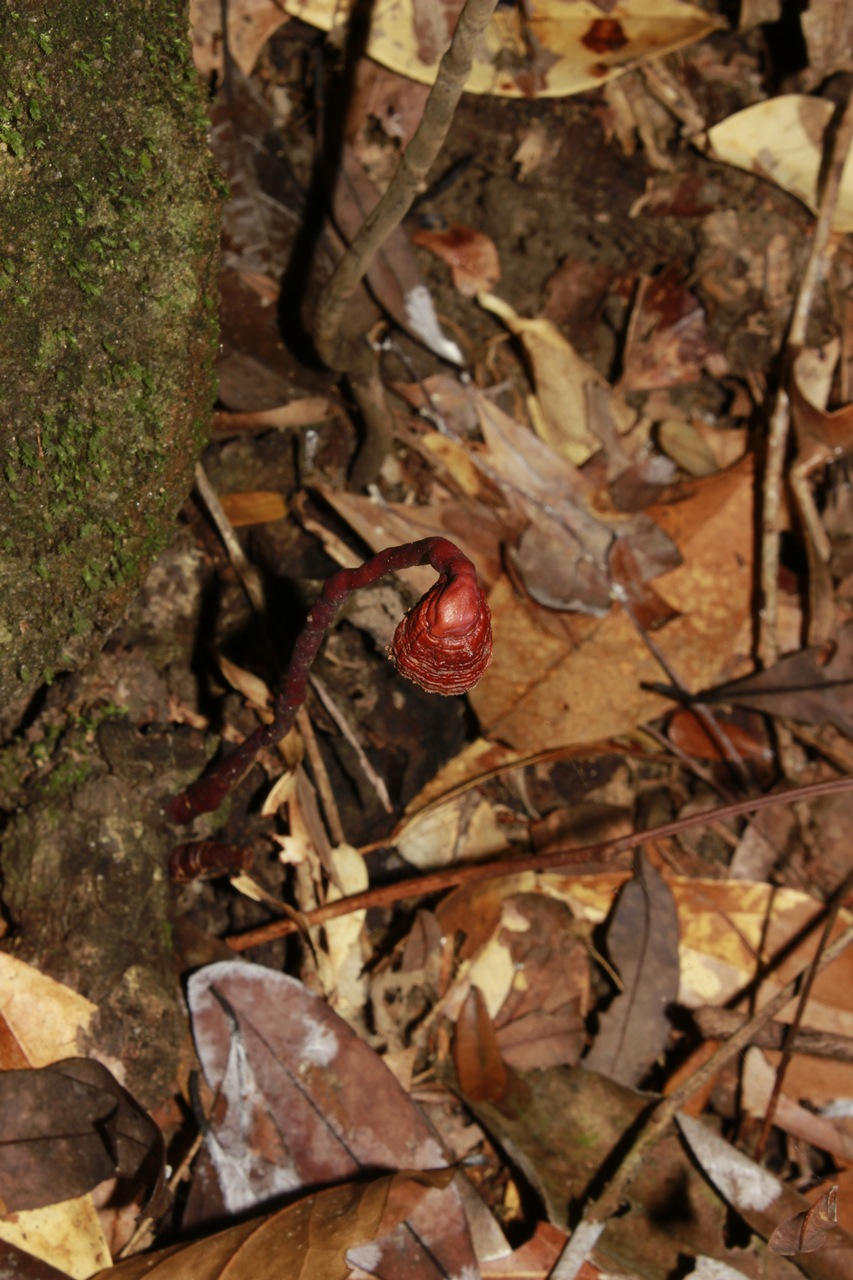
- Haddowia longipes from Vietnam

Scientific classification
- Kingdom: Fungi
- Division: Basidiomycota
- Class: Agaricomycetes
- Order: Polyporales
- Family: Ganodermataceae
- Genus: Haddowia; Steyaert (1972)

Type species
- Haddowia longipes (Lév.) Steyaert (1972)

Species
- H. aëtii H. longipes H. neurospora

= Haddowia =

Genus of fungi

Haddowia is a genus of polypore fungi in the family Ganodermataceae. The genus was circumscribed by Belgian mycologist René Léopold Steyaert in 1972, with Haddowia longipes (previously Amauroderma) as the type species. The genus name honors William Robert Haddow, "in view of his careful studies in the genus Ganoderma.
