= Amauroderma bataanense =

Scientific classification
- Kingdom: Fungi
- Division: Basidiomycota
- Class: Agaricomycetes
- Order: Polyporales
- Family: Ganodermataceae
- Genus: Amauroderma
- Species: A. bataanense

Binomial name
- Amauroderma bataanense Murrill (1908)

Species of fungus

Amauroderma bataanense is a tough woody mushroom in the family Ganodermataceae. It is a polypore fungus.
