= Amauroderma fuscatum =

Scientific classification
- Domain: Eukaryota
- Kingdom: Fungi
- Division: Basidiomycota
- Class: Agaricomycetes
- Order: Polyporales
- Family: Ganodermataceae
- Genus: Amauroderma
- Species: A. fuscatum

Binomial name
- Amauroderma fuscatum Otieno (1969)

Species of fungus

Amauroderma fuscatum is a tough woody mushroom in the family Ganodermataceae. It is a polypore fungus.
