= Lignosus dimiticus =

Scientific classification
- Kingdom: Fungi
- Division: Basidiomycota
- Class: Agaricomycetes
- Order: Polyporales
- Family: Polyporaceae
- Genus: Lignosus
- Species: L. dimiticus

Binomial name
- Lignosus dimiticus Ryvarden (1975)

Species of fungus

Lignosus dimiticus is a species of poroid fungus in the family Polyporaceae found in Zaire. Its fruit body features a funnel-shaped cap up to 10 cm (3.9 in) in diameter and 15 mm (0.6 in) thick in the centre. The smooth, white stipe has a woody texture, and measures 8 cm (3.1 in) long and 12–20 mm (0.5–0.8 in) thick. Unlike other members of Lignosus, L. dimiticus has a dimitic hyphal system, as it lacks binding hyphae in its trama and context.
