= Microlicia minensis =

Scientific classification
- Kingdom: Plantae
- Clade: Tracheophytes
- Clade: Angiosperms
- Clade: Eudicots
- Clade: Rosids
- Order: Myrtales
- Family: Melastomataceae
- Genus: Microlicia
- Species: M. minensis

Binomial name
- Microlicia minensis Versiane & R.Romero (2021)

Synonyms
- Lavoisiera canastrensis Almeda & A.B.Martins (2017)

Species of flowering plant

Microlicia minensis is a critically endangered plant species endemic to Brazil, known to live only in Serra da Canastra National Park in Minas Gerais state.

It grows in campo rupestre and campo limpo (montane grassland) from 1200 to 1340 meters elevation on sandy soils. The species has a limited distribution, with an area of occupancy (AOO) of only 8 km^{2}. While all the known populations are within the national park, its habitat is threatened by the increasing intensity and frequency of fires. Martins and Almeda (2017) assessed the species' conservation status as Critically Endangered (CR): B2ab(iii).

The species was first described as Lavoisiera canastrensis by Almeda and A.B. Martins in 2017. In 2021 Versiane et al. merged Lavoisiera into the genus Microlicia. Since Microlicia canastrensis Naudin already existed, L. canastrensis was renamed Microlicia minensis. The species epithet, minensis, refers to Minas Gerais state.
