= Trachyderma =

Scientific classification
- Kingdom: Fungi
- Division: Basidiomycota
- Class: Agaricomycetes
- Order: Polyporales
- Family: Ganodermataceae
- Genus: Trachyderma (Imazeki) Imazeki (1952)

Type species
- Trachyderma tsunodae (Yasuda ex Lloyd) Imazeki (1952)

Genus of fungi

Trachyderma is a genus of fungi in the family Ganodermataceae. The genus name is derived from the Ancient Greek words τραχύς ("rough") and δέρμα ("skin").
