= Humphreya =

Scientific classification
- Kingdom: Fungi
- Division: Basidiomycota
- Class: Agaricomycetes
- Order: Polyporales
- Family: Ganodermataceae
- Genus: Humphreya; Steyaert (1972)

Type species
- Humphreya lloydii (Pat. & Har.) Steyaert (1972)

Species
- H. coffeata H. eminii H. endertii H. lloydii

Genus of fungi

Humphreya is a genus of four species of polypore fungi in the family Ganodermataceae. The genus was circumscribed by Belgian mycologist René Léopold Steyaert in 1972. He proposed Humphreya as a genus segregate from Ganoderma, typified by Ganoderma lloydi Pat. & Har., and included Ganoderma coffeatum and the newly described Humphreya endertii. H. eminii was transferred to the genus (from Ganoderma) by Leif Ryvarden in 1980.

Humphreya differs from Ganoderma by the velvety cap and stipe surfaces of its fruit bodies. Microscopically, the spores of Humphreya feature a crested endosporium (the innermost layer of the spore wall). The generic name Humphreya honours Clarence John Humphrey (1882–1970), a scientist and mycologist specializing in wood-decay fungi.

The Cryptogamic Herbarium of C. J. Humphrey is housed in the University Herbarium of the University of California, Berkeley.

== Species ==
- Humphreya coffeata (Berk.) Steyaert (1972)
- Humphreya eminii (Henn.) Ryvarden (1980)
- Humphreya endertii Steyaert (1972)
- Humphreya lloydii (Pat. & Har.) Steyaert (1972)
