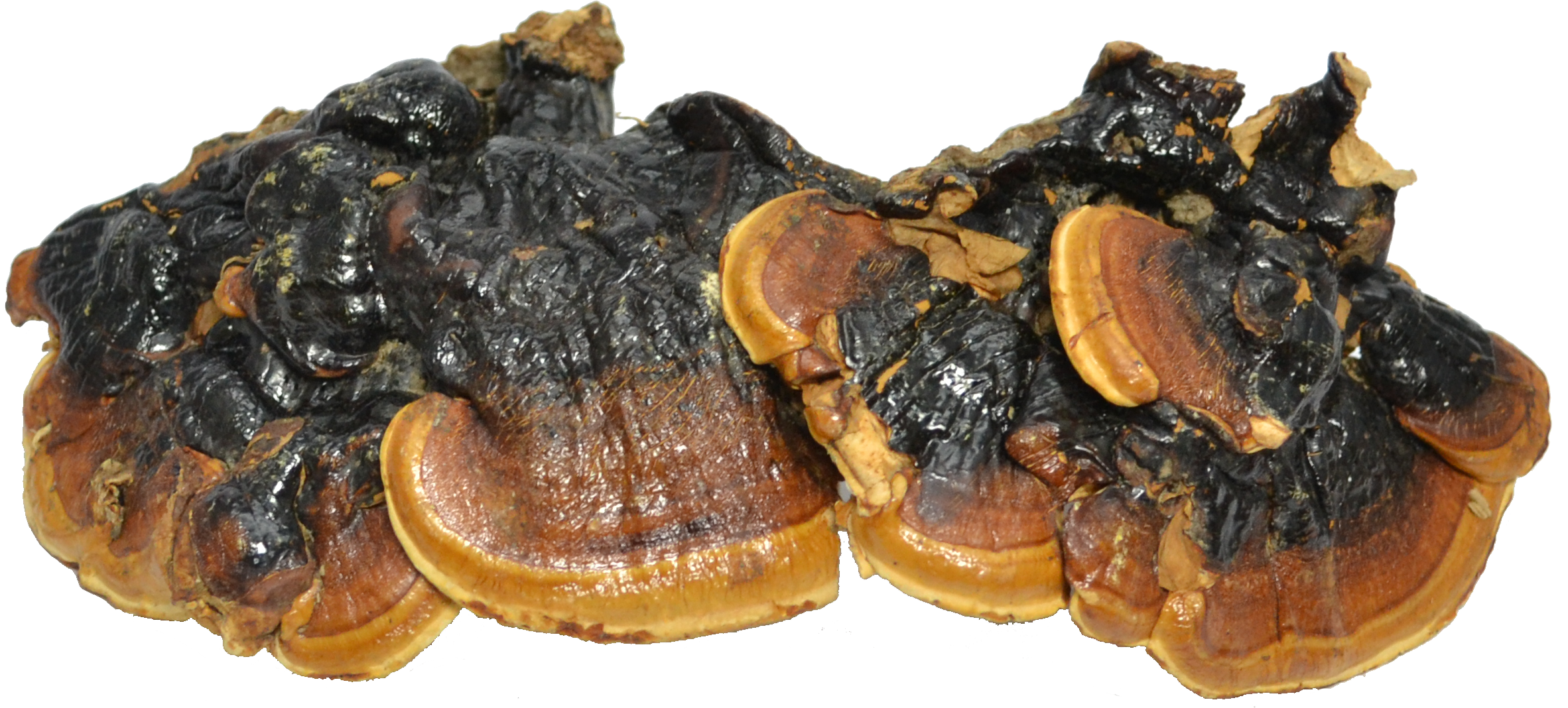

Scientific classification
- Kingdom: Fungi
- Division: Basidiomycota
- Class: Agaricomycetes
- Order: Polyporales
- Family: Ganodermataceae
- Genus: Ganoderma
- Species: G. microsporum

Binomial name
- Ganoderma microsporum R.S.Hseu (1989)

= Ganoderma microsporum =

Species of mushroom

Ganoderma microsporum is a species of Ganoderma mushroom native to Taiwan that grows on willow trees.

== Description ==
Ganoderma microsporum has a relatively short or obscure stem that appears bronze or dark purple. The cap is shelf like or unevenly shaped and has a glazed appearance. The spores measure 6–8.5 by 4.5–5 μm, smaller than the spores of all other known types of Ganoderma.

GMI is regarded as a multi-faceted anti-tumour protein in laboratory studies. In lung cancer cells it induces autophagic cell death through calcium/p53- and Akt/mTOR-dependent signalling. It enhances cisplatin-activated apoptosis, and β-catenin inhibition by GMI triggers apoptosis in cells with either wild-type or mutated EGFR. In nude mice, oral GMI suppressed the growth of pemetrexed-resistant lung cancer xenografts, and it lowered expression of the cancer stem cell marker CD133 through autophagy.

A research team at National Yang Ming Chiao Tung University (NYCU) reported that GMI lowers PD-L1 expression in lung cancer cells by promoting GSK3β-mediated proteasomal degradation. In animal and ex vivo experiments it slowed tumour growth and increased CD8⁺ cytotoxic T-cell infiltration. The team received a Taiwan patent for treating PD-L1-expressing cancer and won a gold medal at WorldInvent Singapore 2025. A 2026 study found that GMI enhances macrophage phagocytosis of lung cancer cells by suppressing STAT3/CD47 signalling in EGFR-mutant non-small-cell lung cancer resistant to gefitinib and osimertinib.

== Taxonomy ==
The species was first discovered in Taipei, Taiwan by R.-S. Hseu in 1982, and published in the scientific journal Mycotaxon in 1989. The specific epithet microsporum refers to the relatively small size of its spores.

== Research ==
Compounds discovered in Ganoderma include polysaccharides, triterpenoids, nucleic acids and fungal immunomodulatory proteins or FIPs. According to the NIH PubMed database on the physiological activities of G. microsporum, primarily from the FIP found in G. microsporum (FIP-gmi or GMI), currently known physiological activities include effects on the central nervous system and the respiratory system.
