= Lignosus tigris =

Scientific classification
- Kingdom: Fungi
- Division: Basidiomycota
- Class: Agaricomycetes
- Order: Polyporales
- Family: Polyporaceae
- Genus: Lignosus
- Species: L. tigris

Binomial name
- Lignosus tigris Chon S.Tan (2013)

Species of fungus

Lignosus tigris is a species of poroid fungus in the family Polyporaceae. Its fruit bodies have a roughly circular, brown to ochre cap measuring up to 11.3 cm (4.4 in) in diameter, supported by a muddy-brown stipe up to 14 cm (5.5 in) long and 1.8 cm (0.7 in) thick. The honeycomb-like pores on the cap underside number 1–2 per millimetre.

Described as a new species in 2013 by mycologist Chon-Seng Tan, it is found in the tropical forests of Pahang, Malaysia. The specific epithet tigris alludes to the local folklore that the fungus originated from milk dripped onto the ground while a tigress fed her cubs. The fungus fruit bodies are similar in appearance to those of Lignosus sacer, but differs in having larger pores, and smaller spores that typically measure 2.5–5.5 by 1.8–3.6 μm.
