= Tomophagus =

Scientific classification
- Kingdom: Fungi
- Division: Basidiomycota
- Class: Agaricomycetes
- Subclass: incertae sedis
- Order: Polyporales
- Family: Ganodermataceae
- Genus: Tomophagus; Murrill, 1905
- Species: T. cattienensis

Binomial name
- Tomophagus cattienensis Le & Moncalvo, 2012

Single-species genus of fungi

Tomophagus is a Basidiomycete bracket-fungus genus in the family Ganodermataceae. The type species Tomophagus colossus, from the tropical Americas and Africa, has now been placed in the genus Ganoderma.

According to the Index Fungorum the remaining (monotypic) species is Tomophagus cattienensis. The holotype of this was collected on tropical hardwood in Cát Tiên National Park, Vietnam, after-which it was named by its finders Ngoc Duong Pham and Le Xuan Tham; its placement was based on morphological evidence and ITS DNA barcoding.
