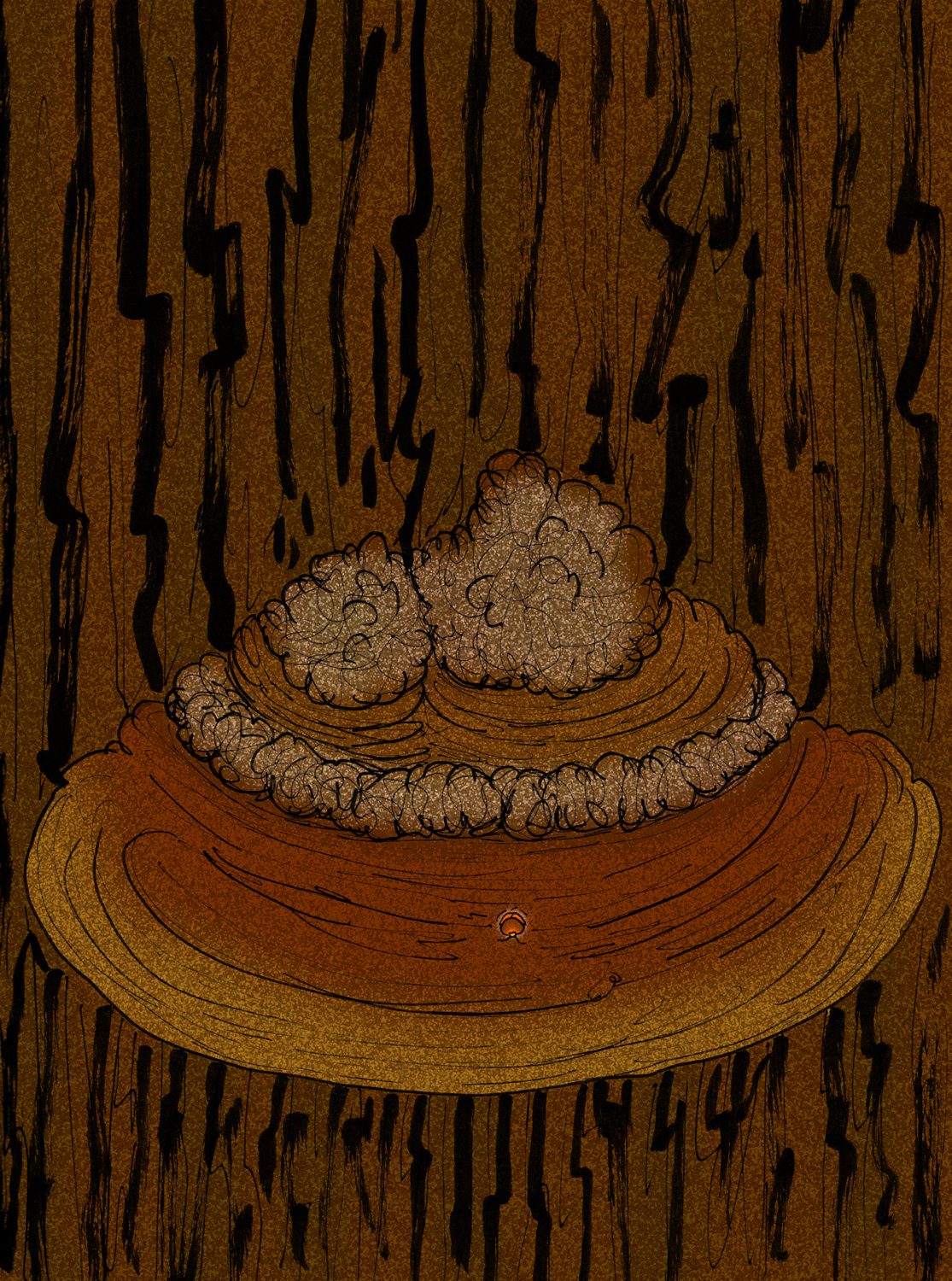
- Restoration of G. libycus

Scientific classification
- Kingdom: Fungi
- Division: Basidiomycota
- Class: Agaricomycetes
- Order: Polyporales
- Family: Ganodermataceae
- Genus: †Ganodermites; A.Fleischm., M.Krings, H.Mayr & Agerer (2007)

Type species
- Ganodermites libycus A.Fleischm., M.Krings, H.Mayr & Agerer (2007)

= Ganodermites =

Ganodermites Temporal range: Lower Miocene

Genus of fossil polypore fungus

Ganodermites is an extinct monotypic genus of polypore fungus in the family Ganodermataceae. Its single member, Ganodermites libycus, is known from a structurally preserved (permineralized) fruit body from the Lower Miocene (near the start of the Neogene) (23.03–15.7 Ma) of Jebel Zelten in North Africa. The fungus is thought to be closely related to the modern genus Ganoderma because of shared characteristics, including distinct growth increments in the fruit body, a stratified hymenium, equidistantly arranged pores, and double-layered spore walls. G. libycus has a trimitic hyphal system, with generative, skeletal, and binding hyphae.

The fruit body of G. libycus has tunnels containing fecal pellets, suggesting that the fungus was visited by fungivorous arthropods.
