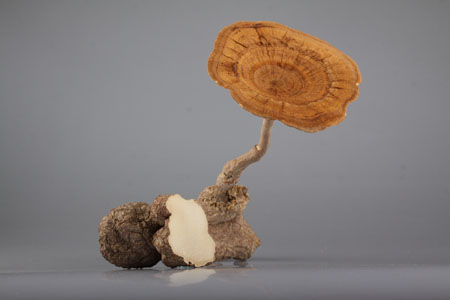
- Lignosus rhinocerus

Scientific classification
- Kingdom: Fungi
- Division: Basidiomycota
- Class: Agaricomycetes
- Order: Polyporales
- Family: Polyporaceae
- Genus: Lignosus; Lloyd ex Torrend (1920)

Type species
- Lignosus sacer (Afzel. ex Fr.) Torrend (1920)

= Lignosus =

Genus of fungi

Lignosus is a genus of polypore fungi in the family Polyporaceae. The genus was circumscribed in 1920 by mycologists Curtis Gates Lloyd and Camille Torrend, with L. sacer as the type species.

== Description ==
The fruit bodies of Lignosus fungi are annual. They have a cap that is coloured white to brown, with a central supporting stipe. The texture of the cap surface is smooth to very finely tomentose. Pores on the cap underside range in size from small to large. The stipe originates from a sclerotium in the ground. The hyphal system is trimitic. Generative hyphae have clamp connections and are hyaline. There are binding and skeletal hyphae in the context, sclerotium and the stipe. The hymenium lacks cystidia. Spores are smooth, ellipsoid, hyaline, and inamyloid.

Lignosus is similar in morphology to Microporus, but the fungi in this latter genus grow on wood and do not arise from a sclerotium. Microporus spores are cylindrical to allantoid (sausage-shaped).

== Species ==
The genome of the species L. rhinocerus, the sclerotium of which is used as a traditional medicine in Southeast Asia, was published in 2014. Its genome is enriched with genes involved in the biosynthesis of sesquiterpenoid compounds. Eight species are known in Lignosus:

- L. cameronensis Chon S.Tan (2013) – Malaysia
- L. dimiticus Ryvarden (1975) - Zaire
- L. ekombitii Douanla-Meli (2003) – Cameroon
- L. goetzei (Henn.) Ryvarden (1972)
- L. hainanensis B.K.Cui (2011) – Tropical China
- L. rhinocerus (Cooke) Ryvarden (1972)
- L. sacer (Afzel. ex Fr.) Torrend (1920) - Africa, Indochina
- L. tigris Chon S.Tan (2013) – Malaysia
