= Lignosus cameronensis =

Scientific classification
- Kingdom: Fungi
- Division: Basidiomycota
- Class: Agaricomycetes
- Order: Polyporales
- Family: Polyporaceae
- Genus: Lignosus
- Species: L. cameronensis

Binomial name
- Lignosus cameronensis Chon S.Tan (2013)

Species of fungus

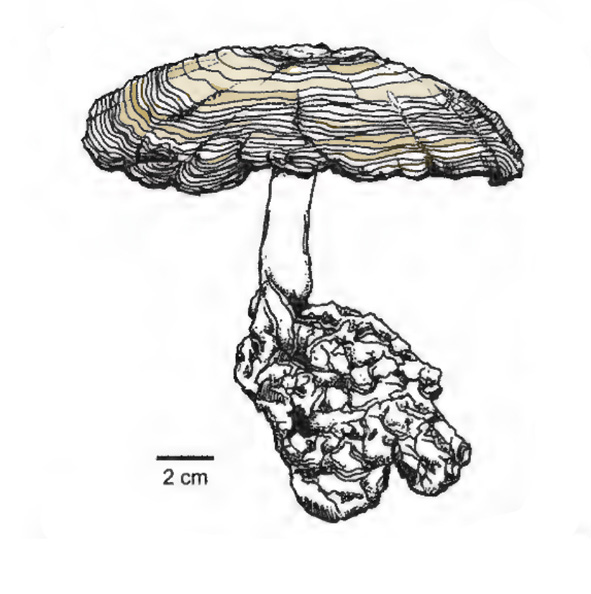

Lignosus cameronensis is a species of poroid fungus in the family Polyporaceae. Its fruit bodies have a roughly circular brown cap measuring up to 13.5 cm (5.3 in) in diameter, supported by a muddy brown stipe up to 8.5 cm (3.3 in) long and 1.5 cm (0.6 in) thick. The pores on the cap underside are tiny, numbering two to four per millimetre.

Described as a new species in 2013, it is found in the tropical forests of Pahang, Malaysia. The specific epithet cameronensis refers to the type locality, the Cameron Highlands. The fungus fruit bodies are similar in appearance to those of Lignosus ekombitii, but differs in having smaller spores that typically measure 2.4–4.8 by 1.9–3.2 μm.
