= Adustomyces =

Scientific classification
- Kingdom: Fungi
- Division: Basidiomycota
- Class: Agaricomycetes
- Order: Agaricales
- Family: Pterulaceae
- Genus: Adustomyces; Jülich (1979)

Type species
- Adustomyces lusitanicus (Torrend) Jülich

Synonyms
- Stereum repandum var. lusitanicum Torrend (1913); Cerocorticium lusitanicum (Torrend) Jülich & Stalpers (1980); Radulomyces lusitanicus (Torrend) Hjortstam (1998)

Genus of fungi

Adustomyces is a fungal genus in the family Pterulaceae. The genus is monotypic, containing the single resupinate species Adustomyces lusitanicus (originally named Stereum repandum var. lusitanicum by Camille Torrend in 1913), found in Europe and Africa. Adustomyces was described by Swiss mycologist Walter Jülich in 1979.

== See also ==
- List of Agaricales genera
