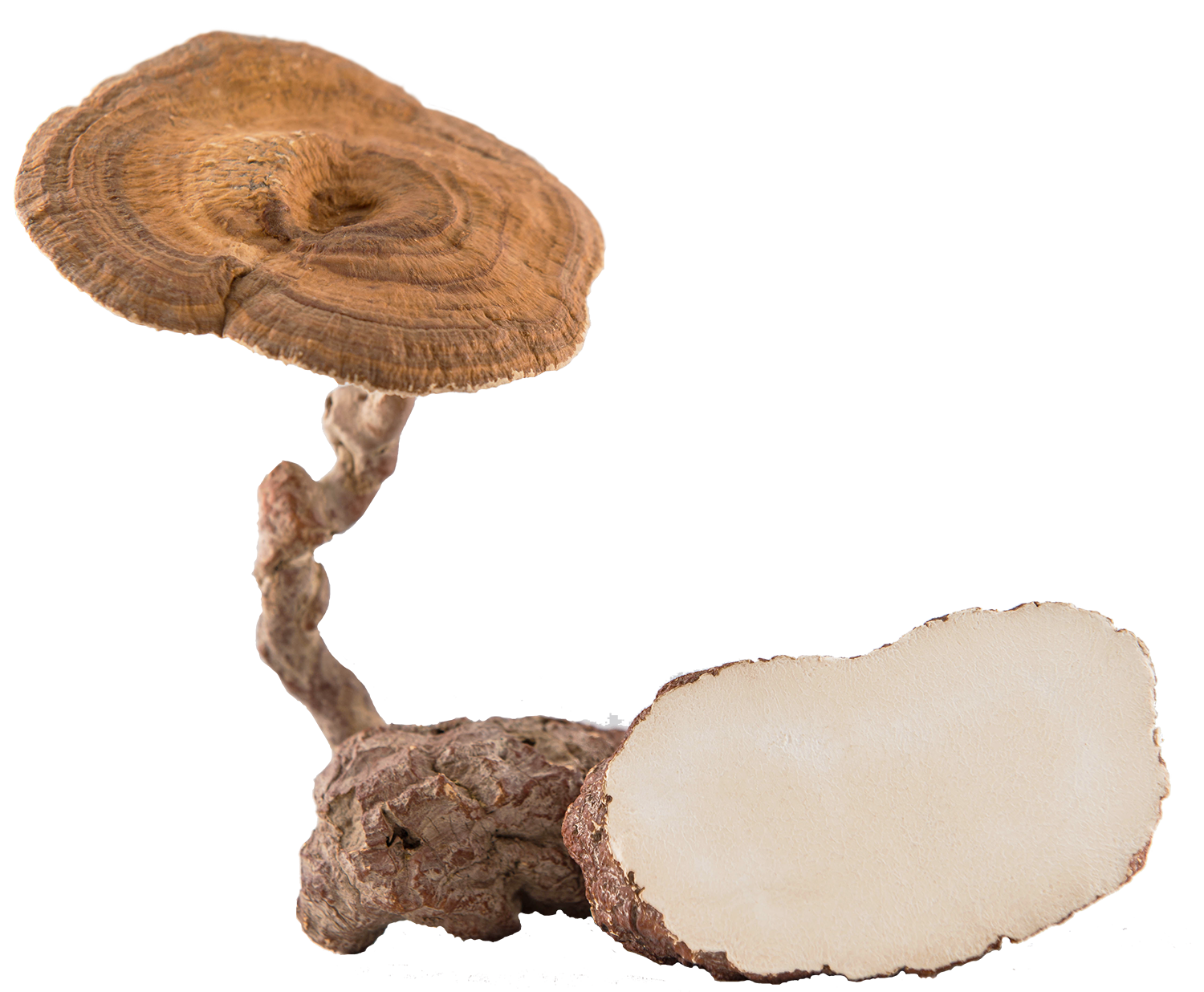

Scientific classification
- Kingdom: Fungi
- Division: Basidiomycota
- Class: Agaricomycetes
- Order: Polyporales
- Family: Polyporaceae
- Genus: Lignosus
- Species: L. rhinocerus

Binomial name
- Lignosus rhinocerus (Cooke) Ryvarden (1972)

Synonyms
- Polyporus rhinocerus Cooke (1879); Fomes rhinocerus (Cooke) Sacc. (1888); Scindalma rhinocerus (Cooke) Kuntze (1898); Polyporus sacer var. rhinocerus (Cooke) Lloyd (1920); Polystictus rhinocerus (Cooke) Boedijn (1940); Microporus rhinocerus (Cooke) Imazeki (1952)

= Lignosus rhinocerus =

Species of fungus

Lignosus rhinocerus, commonly known as tiger milk mushroom or tiger's milk mushroom, belongs to family Polyporaceae in the division Basidiomycota. This fungus is geographically distributed only in tropical rainforests in the region of South China, Thailand, Malaysia, Indonesia, Philippines and Papua New Guinea.

In Malaysia, the tiger milk mushroom is more often known as "Cendawan Susu Rimau". It has been used in traditional medicine.

== History ==
The tiger milk mushroom was first reported in the West in 1664 when a European government agent was given this product upon sailing to the South East Asian Region. According to The Diary of John Evelyn (Publication dated 22 June 1664), this mushroom was named 'Lac tygridis', meaning "tiger's milk". In his publication, Evelyn also recorded that this fungus was used by the local people to treat diseases for which European doctors found no cure. In 1890, Sir Henry Nicholas Ridley, the father of Malaya's rubber industry, recorded that this fungus was an important medicinal mushroom used by local communities. He even attempted to cultivate it but failed. In the same year, this fungus was scientifically documented by Mordecai Cubitt Cooke who named it as Fomes rhinocerotis based on a specimen found in Penang. Today, it is known by the scientific name Lignosus rhinocerus.

== Mycological description ==
Lignosus rhinocerus has a centrally stipulate pileus, meaning a mushroom cap which grows at the end of a stipe (stem) arising from a buried tuber or sclerotium. Their growth is solitary, and typically only one fruit body can be found at a time.

== Research ==
A 2018 review of the investigations into Lignosus rhinocerotis concluded that "there is a paucity of validation studies including human clinical trials of the mycochemicals of L. rhinocerotis."

Tiger milk mushroom sclerotia contain various polysaccharides, polysaccharide-protein complexes, and β-glucan.

Aboriginal people boil it with Tongkat ali to be used as general tonic.

== Cultivation ==
The mushroom was successfully cultivated using solid fermentation technology.

== Sources ==
Journals

- Lau, Beng Fye; Abdullah, Noorlidah; Aminudin, Norhaniza (2013-05-22). "Chemical Composition of the Tiger's Milk Mushroom, Lignosus rhinocerotis (Cooke) Ryvarden, from Different Developmental Stages". Journal of Agricultural and Food Chemistry. 61 (20): 4890–4897. doi:10.1021/jf4002507. ISSN 0021-8561.
- Ridley, H. N. (1890). "ON THE SO-CALLED TIGER'S MILK". Journal of the Straits Branch of the Royal Asiatic Society (22). Malaysian Branch of the Royal Asiatic Society: 341–344. ISSN 2304-7534. JSTOR 41560793.
