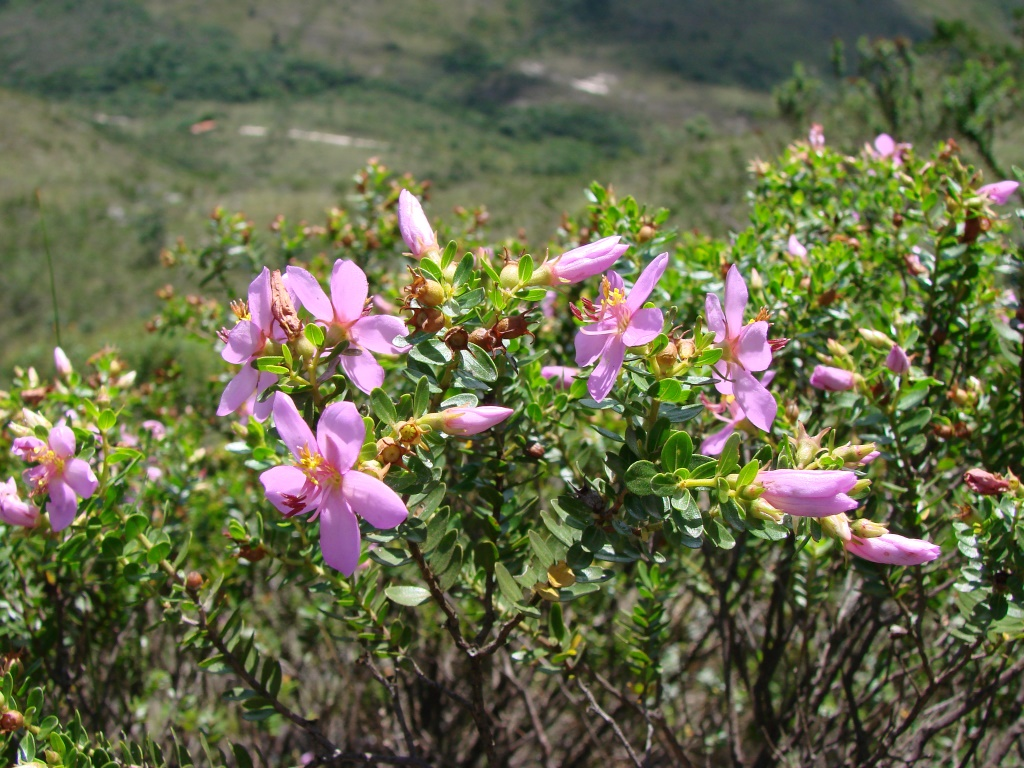
- Microlicia hatschbachii

Scientific classification
- Kingdom: Plantae
- Clade: Embryophytes
- Clade: Tracheophytes
- Clade: Angiosperms
- Clade: Eudicots
- Clade: Rosids
- Order: Myrtales
- Family: Melastomataceae
- Subfamily: Melastomatoideae
- Tribe: Microlicieae
- Genus: Microlicia; D.Don

Species
- 276; See text

Synonyms
- Chaetostoma DC. (1828); Lavoisiera DC. (1828); Stenodon Naudin (1844); Trembleya DC. (1828)

= Microlicia =

Genus of flowering plants

Microlicia is a genus of flowering plants in the family Melastomataceae, native to northern South America, particularly Brazil. They tend to be subshrubs.

Microlicia was first described by David Don in 1823. In 2021 Versiane et al. discovered that Microlicia was paraphyletic, and expended it to include the related genera Chaetostoma, Lavoisiera, Stenodon, and Trembleya. The newly circumscribed genus, with 276 species, is one of the largest in family Melastomataeae. The genus name Trembleya was in honour of Abraham Trembley (1710–1784) a Genevan naturalist, Jean Trembley (1704–1785), a Swiss mathematician, and also Jacques-André Trembley (1714–1763), a Swiss botanist.

== Species ==
Currently accepted species include:

- Microlicia abairana R.Romero & Woodgyer
- Microlicia acerosa Versiane & R.Romero
- Microlicia acuminata Naudin
- Microlicia acuminifolia Versiane & R.Romero
- Microlicia adamantium (Pedersoli) Versiane & R.Romero
- Microlicia agrestis Cogn.
- Microlicia alba (DC.) Versiane & R.Romero
- Microlicia albiflora (Naudin) Versiane & R.Romero
- Microlicia altoparaisensis (R.B.Pacifico, Almeda & Fidanza) Versiane & R.Romero
- Microlicia amblysepala Ule
- Microlicia amplexicaulis Cogn.
- Microlicia angustifolia (Cogn.) Versiane & R.Romero
- Microlicia arachnoidea (Almeda & A.B.Martins) Versiane & R.Romero
- Microlicia arenariifolia DC.
- Microlicia armata (Spreng.) Versiane & R.Romero
- Microlicia ascendens Almeda & R.B.Pacifico
- Microlicia attenuata Fontelas & R.Romero
- Microlicia aurea Wurdack
- Microlicia aureoglandulosa Woodgyer & R.Romero
- Microlicia australis (Naudin) Baill.
- Microlicia avicularis Mart. ex Naudin
- Microlicia baccharoides Mart. ex Naudin
- Microlicia bahiensis Markgr.
- Microlicia balsamifera Mart.
- Microlicia barbata R.B.Pacifico & Almeda
- Microlicia barretoana R.B.Pacifico, Almeda & Fidanza
- Microlicia baumgratziana A.B.Martins & Koschn.
- Microlicia belinelloi (A.B.Martins & Almeda) Versiane & R.Romero
- Microlicia benthamiana Triana
- Microlicia bicolor R.B.Pacifico, Almeda & Gali
- Microlicia blanchetiana Cogn.
- Microlicia caatingae J.Coelho & R.Romero
- Microlicia calycina (Cham.) Versiane & R.Romero
- Microlicia canastrensis Naudin
- Microlicia candolleana R.Romero & Versiane
- Microlicia caparaoensis Versiane, R.Goldenb. & R.Romero
- Microlicia capitata R.B.Pacifico, Almeda & Fidanza
- Microlicia capixaba Versiane, Fontelas & R.Romero
- Microlicia caryophyllea (Naudin) Versiane & R.Romero
- Microlicia cataphracta (DC.) Versiane & R.Romero
- Microlicia catolensis Woodgyer & Zappi
- Microlicia cerifera (Gardner) A.B.Martins & Almeda
- Microlicia chamissoana (Naudin) Versiane & R.Romero
- Microlicia chrysantha Wurdack
- Microlicia chrysoglandulosa R.Romero, Versiane, Fontelas & D.O.Diniz-Neres
- Microlicia ciliatoglandulosa R.Romero
- Microlicia cipoana Hoehne
- Microlicia clavillosa Wurdack
- Microlicia cogniauxiana R.Romero
- Microlicia colombiana Humberto Mend. & R.Romero
- Microlicia comparilis Wurdack
- Microlicia confertiflora Naudin
- Microlicia congestiflora Versiane & R.Romero
- Microlicia contasensis Woodgyer & Zappi
- Microlicia cordata Cham.
- Microlicia cordifolia Versiane & R.Romero
- Microlicia coriacea R.B.Pacifico, Almeda & Fidanza
- Microlicia coronata R.B.Pacifico & Almeda
- Microlicia crassa R.Romero
- Microlicia crassifolia (DC.) Versiane & R.Romero
- Microlicia crebropunctata Pilg.
- Microlicia crenulata Mart.
- Microlicia crispa Woodgyer & R.Romero
- Microlicia cryptandra Naudin
- Microlicia cupressina D.Don
- Microlicia curralensis Brade
- Microlicia curtiana Versiane & R.Romero
- Microlicia curticalycina R.Romero & Woodgyer
- Microlicia cuspidifolia Mart. ex Naudin
- Microlicia damazioi Brade
- Microlicia daneui R.B.Pacifico & Almeda
- Microlicia daviesiana (Almeda & A.B.Martins) Versiane & R.Romero
- Microlicia decumbens Gali, Almeda & Fidanza
- Microlicia deflexa R.Romero & Valentim
- Microlicia denudata Cogn.
- Microlicia donii Fidanza & R.B.Pacifico
- Microlicia doryphylla Naudin
- Microlicia edmundoi Brade
- Microlicia elegans Naudin
- Microlicia ericoides D.Don
- Microlicia euphorbioides Mart.
- Microlicia fasciculata Mart.
- Microlicia fastigiata (Naudin) Versiane & R.Romero
- Microlicia firmula (DC.) Versiane & R.Romero
- Microlicia flava R.Romero
- Microlicia flaviflora Versiane & R.Romero
- Microlicia flavipetala Versiane & R.Romero
- Microlicia flavovirens Woodgyer & Zappi
- Microlicia formosa Cham.
- Microlicia frankii R.B.Pacifico & Fidanza
- Microlicia furnensis R.Romero
- Microlicia ganevii Woodgyer & R.Romero
- Microlicia gentianoides (DC.) Versiane & R.Romero
- Microlicia gertii R.Romero & Versiane
- Microlicia giuliettiana A.B.Martins & Almeda
- Microlicia glandulifera Cogn.
- Microlicia glazioviana Cogn.
- Microlicia glaziovii (Cogn.) Versiane & R.Romero
- Microlicia goldenbergii Almeda & R.B.Pacifico
- Microlicia gracilis Fontelas & R.Romero
- Microlicia graveolens DC.
- Microlicia guanayana Wurdack
- Microlicia harleyi Wurdack
- Microlicia hatschbachii Wurdack
- Microlicia helvola Triana
- Microlicia hexapetala (D.Nunes, D.O.Diniz, Koschn. & M.J.Silva) Versiane & R.Romero
- Microlicia hilairei Versiane & R.Romero
- Microlicia hirsutissima Naudin
- Microlicia hirta Pataro & R.Romero
- Microlicia hirticalyx R.Romero & Woodgyer
- Microlicia humilis Naudin
- Microlicia inermis (Naudin) Versiane & R.Romero
- Microlicia inquinans Naudin
- Microlicia insignis Cham.
- Microlicia intercalycina Pataro & R.Romero
- Microlicia inversa (Fidanza, A.B.Martins & Almeda) Versiane & R.Romero
- Microlicia isophylla DC.
- Microlicia isostemon Wurdack
- Microlicia itambana (DC.) Versiane & R.Romero
- Microlicia joaosemiriana R.Romero & Versiane
- Microlicia johnwurdackiana R.Romero & Valentim
- Microlicia jolyana Versiane & R.Romero
- Microlicia jungermannioides DC.
- Microlicia juniperina A.St.-Hil.
- Microlicia karinae Almeda & R.B.Pacifico
- Microlicia laniflora (D.Don) Baill.
- Microlicia latifolia D.O.Diniz & M.J.Silva
- Microlicia leucopetala Wurdack
- Microlicia linifolia Cham.
- Microlicia longicalycina R.Romero
- Microlicia longifolia R.B.Pacifico, Almeda & Fidanza
- Microlicia longiglandulosa R.Romero & Versiane
- Microlicia longipedicellata Almeda & A.B.Martins
- Microlicia longirostrata R.Romero, Fontelas & Versiane
- Microlicia longisepala Wurdack
- Microlicia luetzelburgii Markgr.
- Microlicia lutea Markgr.
- Microlicia macaubensis Gali, R.B.Pacifico & Almeda
- Microlicia macedoi L.B.Sm. & Wurdack
- Microlicia macrantha Versiane & R.Romero
- Microlicia macrocarpa (Naudin) Versiane & R.Romero
- Microlicia macropetala Pataro & R.Romero
- Microlicia macrophylla Naudin
- Microlicia maculata R.Romero
- Microlicia martiana O.Berg ex Triana
- Microlicia matogrossensis Versiane & R.Romero
- Microlicia maximowicziana Cogn.
- Microlicia melanostagma Pilg.
- Microlicia mello-barretoi (Markgr.) Versiane & R.Romero
- Microlicia mendoncaei Cogn.
- Microlicia microphylla Cogn.
- Microlicia minensis Versiane & R.Romero
- Microlicia minima Markgr.
- Microlicia minor Versiane & R.Romero
- Microlicia misteriosa Versiane, R.Goldenb. & R.Romero
- Microlicia monticola Wurdack
- Microlicia morii Wurdack
- Microlicia morrensis R.B.Pacifico & Almeda
- Microlicia mucorifera (DC.) Versiane & R.Romero
- Microlicia mucugensis (Wurdack) Almeda & A.B.Martins
- Microlicia multicaulis Mart.
- Microlicia mutabilis R.B.Pacifico, Almeda & Fidanza
- Microlicia myrtoidea Cham.
- Microlicia naudiniana R.Romero
- Microlicia neglecta Cogn.
- Microlicia neogracilis Versiane & R.Romero
- Microlicia neopyrenaica (Naudin) Versiane & R.Romero
- Microlicia nervosa R.Romero
- Microlicia nervulosa (Naudin) Versiane & R.Romero
- Microlicia noblickii (Wurdack) A.B.Martins & Almeda
- Microlicia nodotricha Almeda & R.B.Pacifico
- Microlicia nortecipoana R.B.Pacifico, Fidanza & Almeda
- Microlicia obovatifolia R.B.Pacifico, Fidanza & Almeda
- Microlicia obtusifolia Cogn. ex R.Romero
- Microlicia occidentalis Naudin
- Microlicia oligochaeta Wurdack
- Microlicia ordinata (Wurdack) Almeda & A.B.Martins
- Microlicia pabstii Brade
- Microlicia pacificoi Almeda & Fidanza
- Microlicia parviflora (D.Don) Versiane & R.Romero
- Microlicia parvula (Markgr.) Koschn. & A.B.Martins
- Microlicia pataroi R.B.Pacifico, Almeda & Gali
- Microlicia pentagona (Naudin) Versiane & R.Romero
- Microlicia petasensis Wurdack
- Microlicia petiolulata Cogn. ex R.Romero & Woodgyer
- Microlicia phlogiformis (DC.) Versiane & R.Romero
- Microlicia piatensis Almeda & R.B.Pacifico
- Microlicia piauiensis R.B.Pacifico & Almeda
- Microlicia pilosa Versiane & R.Romero
- Microlicia pilosissima Cogn.
- Microlicia pinheiroi Wurdack
- Microlicia piranii R.B.Pacifico, Almeda & Fidanza
- Microlicia pithyoides (Cham.) Versiane & R.Romero
- Microlicia plinervia Versiane & R.Romero
- Microlicia plumosa Woodgyer & Zappi
- Microlicia pohliana (O.Berg ex Triana) Versiane & R.Romero
- Microlicia polychaeta R.B.Pacifico, Almeda & Fidanza
- Microlicia polystemma Naudin
- Microlicia pradosiana (Netto) Versiane & R.Romero
- Microlicia prostrata R.B.Pacifico & Almeda
- Microlicia psammophila Wurdack
- Microlicia pseudoscoparia Cogn.
- Microlicia pulcherrima (DC.) Versiane & R.Romero
- Microlicia pulchra Pataro & R.Romero
- Microlicia punctata (DC.) Versiane & R.Romero
- Microlicia purpurata R.Romero & Versiane
- Microlicia pusillifolia Versiane & R.Romero
- Microlicia quinquenervis (Wurdack) Versiane & R.Romero
- Microlicia ramosa Pilg.
- Microlicia raymondii Versiane & R.Romero
- Microlicia regeliana Cogn.
- Microlicia repanda R.B.Pacifico, Almeda & Fidanza
- Microlicia restingae R.Romero & Woodgyer
- Microlicia riedeliana Cogn.
- Microlicia rigida (Cogn.) Versiane & R.Romero
- Microlicia rosmarinoides (DC.) Versiane & R.Romero
- Microlicia rotundifolia Ule
- Microlicia rubra Ferreira-Alves & R.Romero
- Microlicia rugosa R.Romero & Versiane
- Microlicia rundeliana (Almeda & A.B.Martins) Versiane & R.Romero
- Microlicia sampaioana (Barreto) Versiane & R.Romero
- Microlicia scaberula (Naudin) Versiane & R.Romero
- Microlicia schwackeana Glaz. ex Versiane & R.Romero
- Microlicia sciophylla R.B.Pacifico & Fidanza
- Microlicia scoparia DC.
- Microlicia selaginea Naudin
- Microlicia senae (Schwacke) Versiane & R.Romero
- Microlicia serpyllifolia D.Don
- Microlicia serratifolia Versiane & R.Romero
- Microlicia serrulata Cham.
- Microlicia setifolia Versiane & R.Romero
- Microlicia setosa DC.
- Microlicia sickii Brade
- Microlicia sincorensis Mart.
- Microlicia sparsifolia R.B.Pacifico, Almeda & Fidanza
- Microlicia speciosa Versiane & R.Romero
- Microlicia sphagnicola Gleason
- Microlicia stenocladon Naudin
- Microlicia stenodonoides D.O.Diniz-Neres & M.J.Silva
- Microlicia subaequalis Wurdack
- Microlicia subalata Wurdack
- Microlicia suberosa (Naudin) Versiane & R.Romero
- Microlicia sublaevis Cogn.
- Microlicia suborbicularifolia Hoehne
- Microlicia subsetosa DC.
- Microlicia subulata (Triana) Versiane & R.Romero
- Microlicia sulfurea Hoehne
- Microlicia taxifolia Naudin
- Microlicia tenuifolia R.Romero
- Microlicia ternata Cogn.
- Microlicia tetragona (DC.) Versiane & R.Romero
- Microlicia tetramera Almeda & R.B.Pacifico
- Microlicia thomazii (R.B.Pacifico & Fidanza) Versiane & R.Romero
- Microlicia tomentella Naudin
- Microlicia torrandii Brade
- Microlicia trembleyaeformis Naudin
- Microlicia trianae R.Romero & Versiane
- Microlicia trichocalycina DC.
- Microlicia tridentata (Naudin) Versiane & R.Romero
- Microlicia urceolata J.Coelho & R.Romero
- Microlicia variolosa DC.
- Microlicia veadeirana D.O.Diniz-Neres & M.J.Silva
- Microlicia vernicosa (Pedersoli) A.B.Martins & Almeda
- Microlicia versianeae Fontelas, D.O.Diniz & R.Romero
- Microlicia vestita DC.
- Microlicia viminalis Triana
- Microlicia viscida R.Romero & Versiane
- Microlicia viscosa Cogn.
- Microlicia warmingiana Cogn.
- Microlicia weddellii Naudin
- Microlicia windischii Versiane, D.Nunes & R.Romero
- Microlicia woodgyeriana R.Romero & Paranhos
- Microlicia woodii R.B.Pacifico, Almeda & Fidanza
- Microlicia wurdackiana Almeda & A.B.Martins
- Microlicia xylopodifera Fontelas & R.Romero

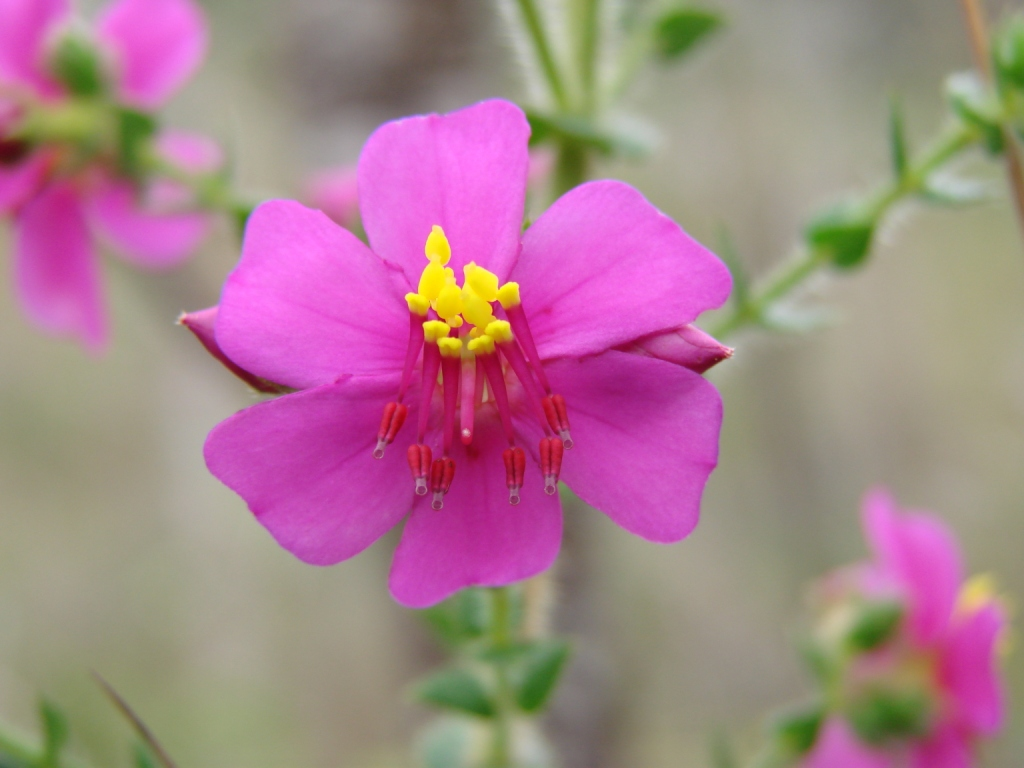
Microlicia euphorbioides flower
