= Camille Torrend =

Portuguese botanist and mycologist (1875–1961)

Camille Torrend (1875-1961) was a Portuguese clergyman and mycologist. He was active in France, Portugal, Ireland and Brazil. He was a professor of botany and phytopathology at the Imperial Agricultural School of Bahia. Torrend edited the exsiccata Fungi selecti exsiccati.

Torrend described the fungi genera of; Amauroderma aurantiacum, Adustomyces, and Lignosus. The fungal genera of Torrendia (the family Amanitaceae) and Torrendiella (in the family Sclerotiniaceae) were both named after him.

== Works ==
- 1908. Les myxomycètes. Étude des espèces connues jusqu’ici. Broteria 7: 5–177, tab., fig.
- 1909. Notes de mycologie Portugaise. Résultats d’une excursion à la propriété royale de Villa Viçosa. Boletim de Sociedade Portuquesa de Ciencias Naturais 3: 3-7
- 1912. Les Basidiomycetes des environs de Lisbonne et de la région de S. Fiel (Beira Baixa). Brotéria Ser. Botânica 10: 192-210
- 1913. Troisième contribution pour l’étude des champignons de l’île de Madère. Brotéria Ser. Botânica 9: 65-181
- 1913. Les Basidiomycetes des environs de Lisbonne et de la région de S. Fiel (Beira Baixa) [cont.]. Brotéria Ser. Botânica 11: 20-64
- 1913. Les Basidiomycetes des environs de Lisbonne et de la région de S. Fiel (Beira Baixa) [concl.]. Brotéria Ser. Botânica 11: 54-98
- 1940. As poliporaceas da Bahia e Estados limítrofes. Anales de la Reunión Sul-Amer. Bot. 1938 2: 325-341

== Honors ==
- El Herbario del Departamento de Micología, from Universidad Federal de Pernambuco

Genus of fungi

- Torrendia (1902),
- Torrendiella (1911),

Species of plants

- (Malvaceae) Bakeridesia torrendii Monteiro
- (Melastomataceae) Microlicia torrendii Brade
