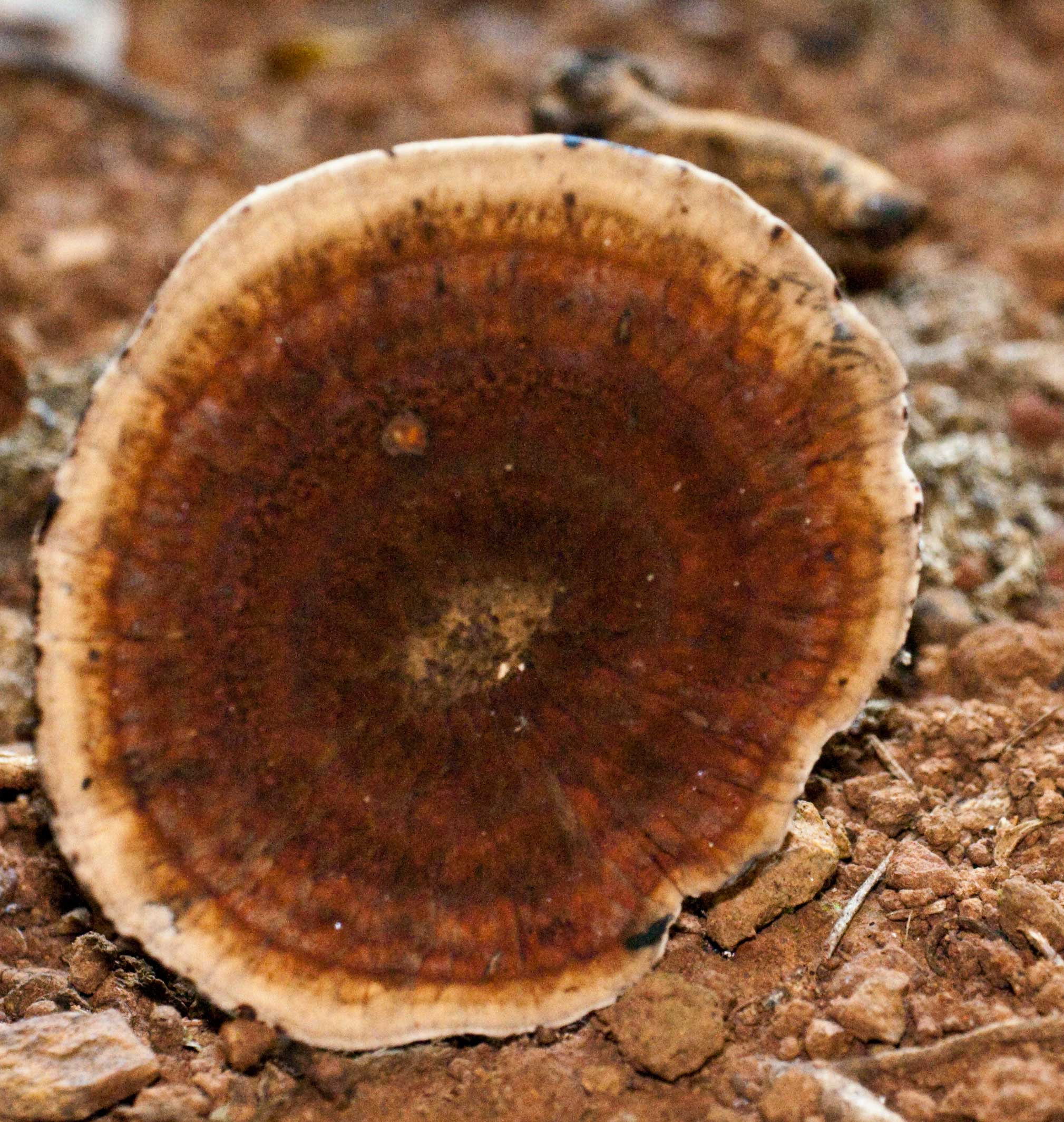
- Amauroderma rude

Scientific classification
- Kingdom: Fungi
- Division: Basidiomycota
- Class: Agaricomycetes
- Order: Polyporales
- Family: Ganodermataceae
- Genus: Amauroderma; Murrill (1905)

Type species
- Amauroderma regulicolor (Berk. ex Cooke) Murrill (1905)

Species
- about 70 species

Synonyms
- Amauroderma (Pat.) Torrend (1920); Ganoderma sect. Amauroderma Pat. (1889); Lazulinospora Burds. & M.J.Larsen (1974); Magoderna Steyaert (1972); Whitfordia Murrill (1908)

= Amauroderma =

Genus of fungi

Amauroderma is a genus of polypore fungi in the family Ganodermataceae. The genus, widespread in tropical areas, contains about 70 species. Amauroderma fungi are wood-decay fungi that feed and fruit on decayed branches and trunks.

The fruit bodies of Amauroderma fungi comprise a cap and a stipe, and are typically woody, leathery, or corky in texture. The spores produced are usually spherical or nearly so, with a characteristic double wall structure that features U-shaped thickenings.

== Taxonomy ==
Amauroderma was circumscribed by American mycologist William Alphonso Murrill in 1905. He set Amauroderma regulicolor (previously known as Fomes regulicolor Berk. ex Cooke), collected from Cuba, as the type species. The name Amauroderma had been used previously by Narcisse Patouillard, when he proposed that Ganoderma be divided into the sections Ganoderma and Amauroderma. Patouillard described the characteristics of section Amauroderma as follows: "Spores globose or subglobose, devoid of truncated base, warty, woodruff or smooth; crust hat or dull stipe pruinose, rarely shining." In 1920, Torrend promoted Ganoderma sect. Amauroderma to generic status, with Amauroderma auriscalpium as the type. This resulted in an illegitimate homonym, as Murrill's earlier usage of the name has priority.

The generic name means "dark/dusky-skinned" (from amauro, meaning "dark or dusky", and derma, meaning "skin").

Several studies using molecular phylogenetics have shown that Amauroderma, as currently circumscribed, is not a monophyletic taxon and will need to be revised.

== Description ==
The fruit bodies of Amauroderma species are stipitate except in A. andina and may attain various shapes although centrally stipitate basidiocarps are most common. Several stipes may arise from the same base, frequently resulting in fused caps and compound fruit bodies. In section some fruit bodies are distinct with one or two distinct inner black bands or zones. The stipe is often duplex with an outer dense layer surrounding an inner softer or hollow core sometimes separated by a black band. In species with a distinct tomentum on the stipe, there is often a dark zone just below the tomentum of the cap. These zones are absent from some species with a pale stipe without a tomentum. However, when present they continue into the context and frequently there is also another zone stretching more or less horizontally across the context.

Most basidiospores of Amauroderma mushrooms have an inner ornamented wall on which there is a hyaline (translucent) epicutis, which is very thin and difficult to see in ordinary microscopic preparations. Mature basidiospores are pale-yellowish. An apiculus (a depressed area where the spore was once attached to the basidium via the sterigma) is often difficult to observe.

== Chemistry ==
Amauroderma camerarium produces the anti-Trichomonas vaginalis protein that has been named amaurocine.

== Habitat and distribution ==
Amauroderma is widespread in tropical areas. Twenty species have been recorded from Brazil; six have been confirmed in China. A collection of Amauroderma sprucei made in Florida in 2016 was the first recorded time that the genus has been collected in the United States.

Amauroderma schomburgkii, A. coltricioides, and A. calcigenum are examples of the genus that have been found fruiting on soil. Amauroderma schomburgkii is the most common neotropical species.

== Species ==
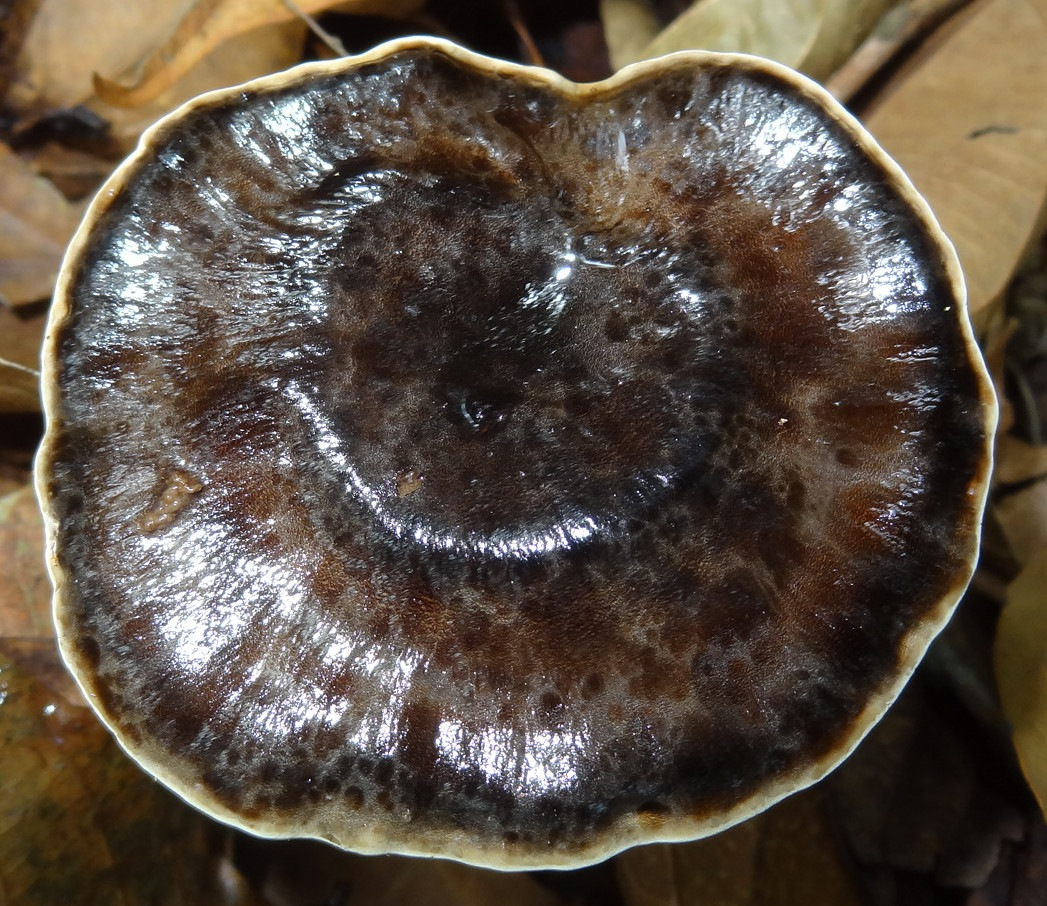
Unidentified Amauroderma found in Colombia

The tenth edition of the Dictionary of the Fungi (2008) indicated that were about 30 species in the genus. As of August 2017, Index Fungorum accepts 68 species of Amauroderma.

- Amauroderma africana Ryvarden (2004)
- Amauroderma albostipitatum A.C.Gomes-Silva, Ryvarden & T.B.Gibertoni (2015) – Brazil
- Amauroderma amoiense J.D.Zhao & L.W.Hsu (1983)
- Amauroderma andina Ryvarden (2004)
- Amauroderma argenteofulvum (Van der Byl) Doidge (1950) – Africa
- Amauroderma auriscalpium (Berk.) Torrend (1920)
- Amauroderma austrosinense J.D.Zhao & L.W.Hsu (1984)
- Amauroderma aurantiacum (Torrend) Gibertoni & Bernicchia (2008) – Brazil; Venezuela
- Amauroderma bataanense Murrill (1908) – Philippines
- Amauroderma boleticeum (Pat. & Gaillard) Torrend (1920) – South America
- Amauroderma brasiliense (Singer) Ryvarden (2004) – Brazil; Guyana; Venezuela
- Amauroderma buloloi Aoshima (1971)
- Amauroderma calcigenum (Berk.) Torrend (1920) – South America
- Amauroderma calcitum D.H.Costa Rezende & E.R.Drechsler-Santos (2016) – Brazil
- Amauroderma camerarium (Berk.) J.S.Furtado (1968) – Brazil, Belize, Colombia, Cuba, Honduras, Peru, Venezuela
- Amauroderma coltricioides T.W.Henkel, Aime & Ryvarden (2003) – Guyana
- Amauroderma concentricum J.Song, Xiao L.He & B.K.Cui – China
- Amauroderma congregatum Corner (1983)
- Amauroderma conicum (Lloyd) Ryvarden (1990)
- Amauroderma conjunctum (Lloyd) Torrend (1920) – Africa
- Amauroderma dayaoshanense J.D.Zhao & X.Q.Zhang (1987) – China
- Amauroderma deviatum Ryvarden (2004)
- Amauroderma ealaense (Beeli) Ryvarden (1972) – Africa
- Amauroderma elegantissimum Ryvarden & Iturr. (2004) – Brazil; Guyana; Venezuela
- Amauroderma exile (Berk.) Torrend (1920) – South America
- Amauroderma faculum Henao-M. (1997) – Colombia
- Amauroderma flabellatum Aime & Ryvarden (2007) – Guyana
- Amauroderma floriformum A.C.Gomes-Silva, Ryvarden & T.B.Gibertoni (2015) – Brazil
- Amauroderma fujianense J.D.Zhao, L.W.Hsu & X.Q.Zhang (1979)
- Amauroderma fuscatum (Lloyd) Otieno (1969)
- Amauroderma fuscoporia Wakef. (1948) – Africa
- Amauroderma grandisporum Gulaid & Ryvarden (1998)
- Amauroderma guangxiense J.D.Zhao & X.Q.Zhang (1986)
- Amauroderma hongkongense L.Fan & B.Liu (1990) – China
- Amauroderma infundibuliforme Wakef. (1917) – Uganda
- Amauroderma insulare (Har. & Pat.) Torrend (1920) – New Caledonia
- Amauroderma intermedium (Bres. & Pat.) Torrend (1920) – Brazil; Colombia; Guadalupe; Martinique; Paraguay; Puerto Rico
- Amauroderma jiangxiense J.D.Zhao & X.Q.Zhang (1987)
- Amauroderma kwiluense (Beeli) Ryvarden (1974)
- Amauroderma laccatostiptatum A.C.Gomes-Silva, Ryvarden & T.B.Gibertoni (2015) – Brazil
- Amauroderma leptopus (Pers.) J.S.Furtado (1967) – Indonesia
- Amauroderma leucosporum Corner (1983)
- Amauroderma longgangense J.D.Zhao & X.Q.Zhang (1986)
- Amauroderma macrosporum J.S.Furtado (1968) – Brazil
- Amauroderma malesianum Corner (1983)
- Amauroderma nigrum Rick (1960)
- Amauroderma nutans (Fr.) Murrill (1908)
- Amauroderma oblongisporum J.S.Furtado (1968) – Africa
- Amauroderma omphalodes (Berk.) Torrend (1920) – Brazil; Guyana; Venezuela; Colombia
- Amauroderma ovisporum A.C.Gomes-Silva, Ryvarden & T.B.Gibertoni (2015) – Brazil
- Amauroderma parasiticum Corner (1983)
- Amauroderma partitum (Berk.) Wakef. (1934) – Brazil; Colombia; Guyana; Venezuela
- Amauroderma perplexum Corner (1983)
- Amauroderma picipes Torrend (1920) – Brazil
- Amauroderma praetervisum (Pat.) Torrend (1920) – Central America; South America; Cuba; Mexico
- Amauroderma preussii (Henn.) Steyaert (1972)
- Amauroderma pudens (Berk.) Ryvarden (1977)
- Amauroderma renidens (Bres.) Torrend (1920) – Brazil
- Amauroderma rude (Berk.) Torrend (1920)
- Amauroderma rugosum (Blume & T.Nees) Torrend (1920)
- Amauroderma salisburiense (Van der Byl) D.A.Reid (1973)
- Amauroderma schomburgkii (Mont. & Berk.) Torrend (1920) – Brazil; Colombia; Costa Rica; Cuba; Guiana Francesa; Guiana; Venezuela; Jamaica; Nicarágua; Panamá; Trinidad
- Amauroderma scopulosum (Berk.) Imazeki (1952)
- Amauroderma secedens Corner (1983)
- Amauroderma sericatum (Lloyd) Wakef. (1917)
- Amauroderma sessile A.C.Gomes-Silva, Ryvarden & T.B.Gibertoni (2015) – Brazil
- Amauroderma solomonense Corner (1983)
- Amauroderma sprucei (Pat.) Torrend (1920) – Brazil; Costa Rica; Colombia; Cuba; Puerto Rico; Jamaica; Belize; French Guiana; Venezuela
- Amauroderma subrugosum (Bres. & Pat.) Torrend (1920)
- Amauroderma subsessile A.C.Gomes-Silva, Ryvarden & T.B.Gibertoni (2015) – Brazil; Costa Rica; Panama
- Amauroderma tapetellum Henao-M. (1997) – Colombia
- Amauroderma trichodematum J.S.Furtado (1968) – Bolivia; Brazil; Guyana; Venezuela
- Amauroderma trulliforme (Lloyd) Torrend (1920)
- Amauroderma unilaterum (Lloyd) Ryvarden (1990)
- Amauroderma variabile (Berk.) Lloyd ex Wakef. (1934)
- Amauroderma wuzhishanense J.D.Zhao & X.Q.Zhang (1987)
- Amauroderma yunnanense J.D.Zhao & X.Q.Zhang (1987)
