= Imperial Agricultural School of Bahia =

Imperial School of Agricultural of Bahia
- Imperial Escola Agrícola da Bahia
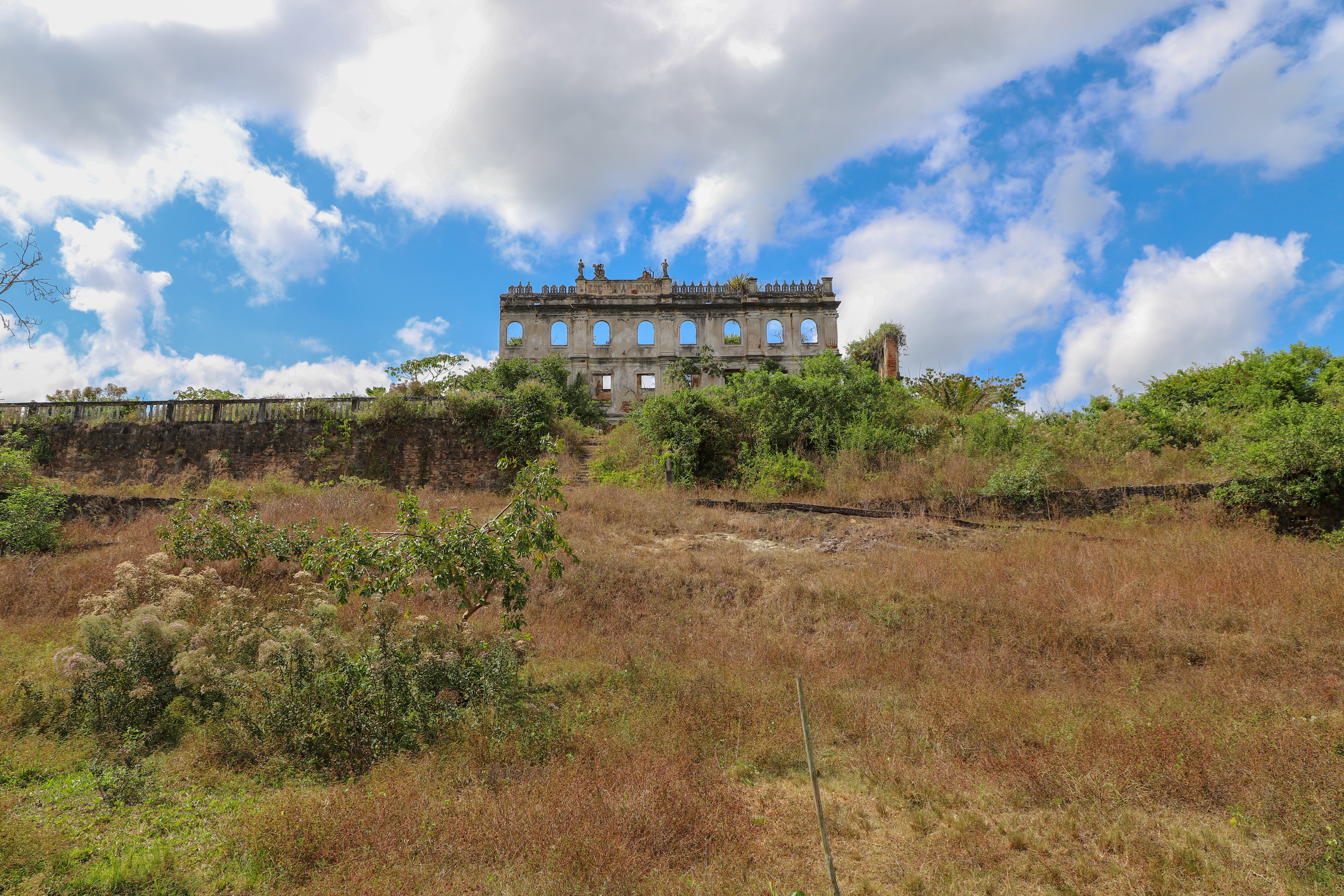
- Imperial School of Agricultural of Bahia

- Location within Brazil

General information
- Architectural style: Neoclassical
- Location: São Francisco do Conde, Bahia, Brazil
- Coordinates: 12.614062°S 38.698699°W
- Inaugurated: 1875

The Imperial School of Agricultural of Bahia (Imperial Escola Agrícola da Bahia) is a former agricultural school in São Francisco do Conde, Bahia, Brazil. It opened in 1875 as one of three agriculture schools founded under the direction of Dom Pedro II in the Northeast region of Brazil. The school became, in succession, the Agricultural Institute of Bahia (Instituto Agrícola da Bahia) in 1904; the Theoretical-Practical Middle School of Agriculture of Bahia (Escola Média-Teórico-Prática de Agricultura da Bahia) in 1911; the College of Agriculture and Veterinary Medicine (Escola Superior de Agricultura e Medicina Veterinária) in 1916; the Agriculture School of Bahia (Escola Agrícola da Bahia) in 1919. The building was completely abandoned by 1958, but the property was transferred to the School of Agriculture of the Federal University of Bahia (Escola de Agronomia da Universidade Federal da Bahia) in 1967. The building is in an advanced state of ruin. Two thirds of its facade remain, but major parts of the structure have fallen into rubble and the site is covered by dense vegetation.

== Protected status ==
The Imperial School of Agricultural of Bahia was listed as a historic structure by the Artistic and Cultural Institute of Bahia (IPAC) in 1981.
