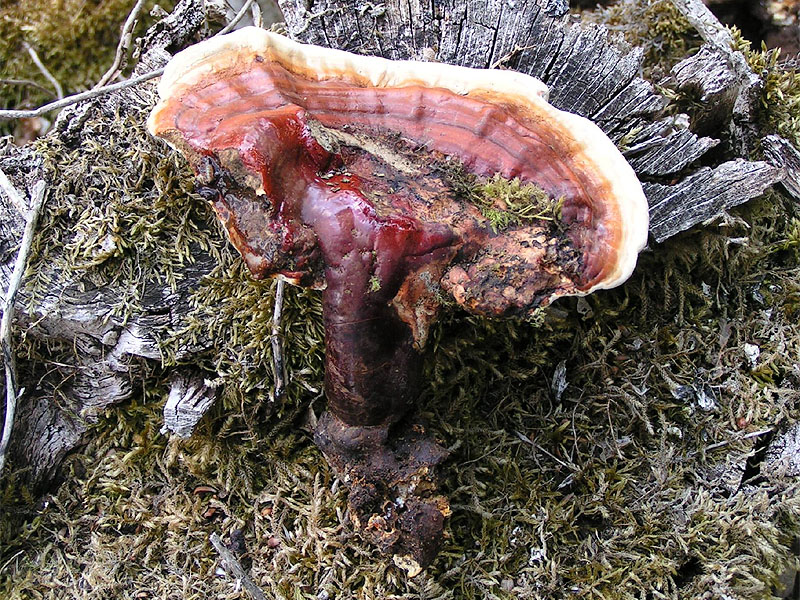
- Ganoderma lucidum

Scientific classification
- Kingdom: Fungi
- Division: Basidiomycota
- Class: Agaricomycetes
- Order: Polyporales
- Family: Ganodermataceae (Donk) Donk (1948)

Type genus
- Ganoderma P.Karst. (1881)

Genera
- Amauroderma; Elfvingia; Ganoderma; †Ganodermites; Haddowia; Humphreya; Poliporopsis; Tomophagus; Trachyderma

= Ganodermataceae =

Family of fungi

The Ganodermataceae are a family of fungi in the order Polyporales. As of April 2018, Index Fungorum accepts 8 genera and 300 species in the family. The family was circumscribed by Dutch mycologist Marinus Anton Donk in 1948 to contain polypores with a double spore wall. The inner wall is verruculose (with moderate-sized growths) to ornamented, thickened and usually coloured, while the outer wall is thin and hyaline.
