= Lingzhi (mushroom) =

Species of fungus

- Traditional Chinese: 靈芝
- Simplified Chinese: 灵芝
Transcriptions
Standard Mandarin
- Hanyu Pinyin: língzhī
- Wade–Giles: ling^{2}-chih^{1}
- IPA: [lǐŋ.ʈʂɻ̩́]
Yue: Cantonese
- Yale Romanization: lìhngjī
- Jyutping: ling4zi1
- IPA: [lɪŋ˩.tsi˥]
Southern Min
- Hokkien POJ: lêng-chi

Lingzhi
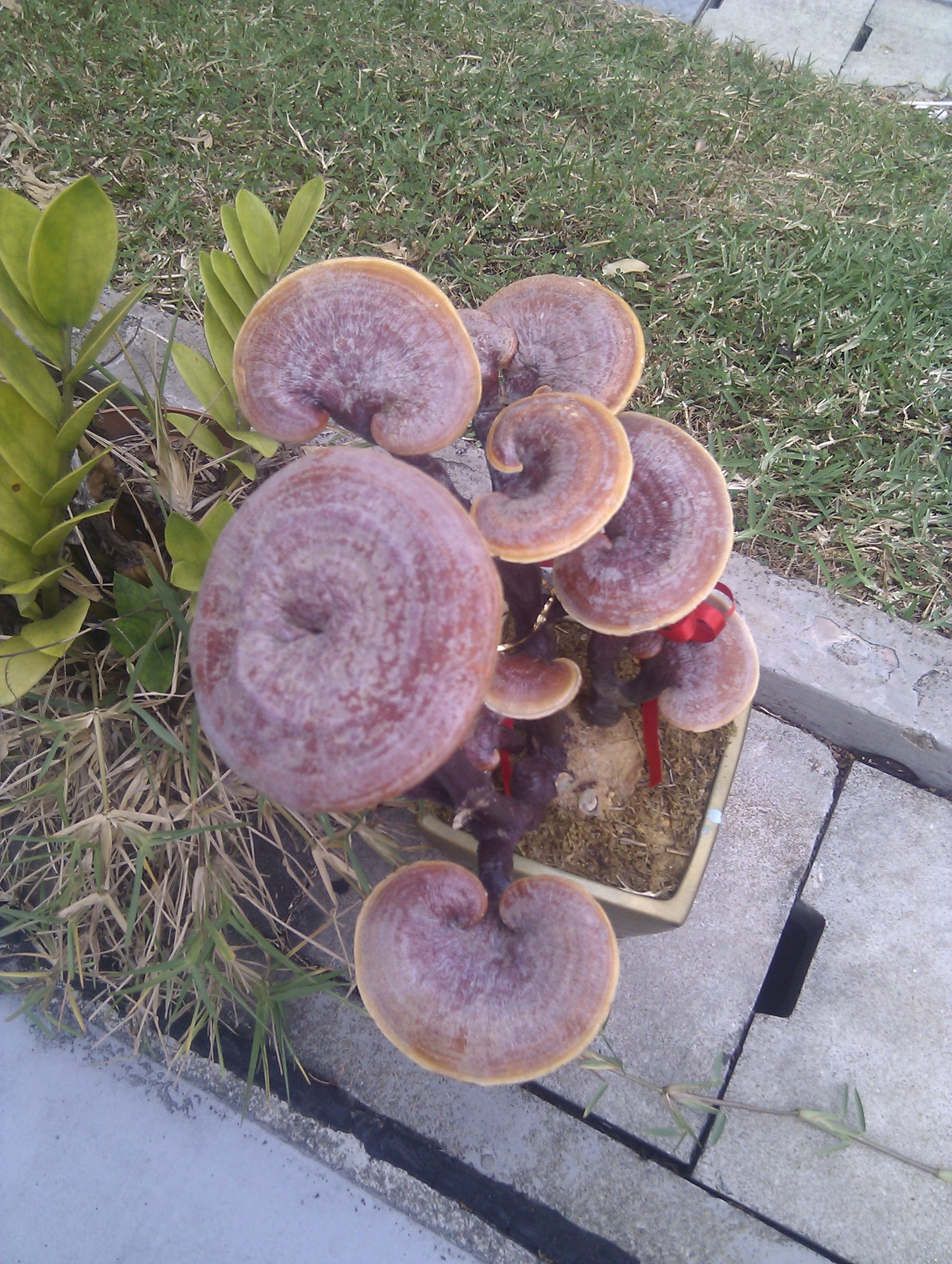

Scientific classification
- Kingdom: Fungi
- Division: Basidiomycota
- Class: Agaricomycetes
- Order: Polyporales
- Family: Ganodermataceae
- Genus: Ganoderma
- Species: G. sichuanense

Binomial name
- Ganoderma sichuanense J.D. Zhao & X.Q. Zhang (1983)

Synonyms
- Ganoderma lingzhi Sheng H. Wu, Y. Cao & Y.C. Dai (2012)

Lingzhi
- Mycological characteristics
- Pores on hymenium
- Cap is offset or indistinct
- Hymenium attachment is irregular or not applicable
- Stipe is bare or lacks a stipe
- Spore print is brown
- Ecology is saprotrophic or parasitic
- Edibility is too hard to eat

Lingzhi (Ganoderma sichuanense), also known as reishi, is a polypore fungus ("bracket fungus") native to East Asia belonging to the genus Ganoderma.

Its reddish brown, varnished, kidney-shaped cap with bands and peripherally inserted stem give it a distinct fan-like appearance. When fresh, the lingzhi is soft, cork-like, and flat. It lacks gills on its underside, and instead releases its spores via fine pores (80–120 μm) in yellow colors.

In nature, it grows at the base and stumps of deciduous trees, especially maples. Lingzhi may be cultivated on hardwood logs, sawdust, or woodchips.

The lingzhi mushroom is used in traditional Chinese medicine.

== Taxonomy ==
Lingzhi, also known as reishi from its Japanese pronunciation, is the ancient "mushroom of immortality", revered for over 2,000 years (with some evidence suggesting use in Neolithic China 6,800 years ago). However, as of 2023 there is an ongoing debate on which one of the described Ganoderma species is the true lingzhi mushroom. It is also likely that a few similar Ganoderma species were considered interchangeable.

In the scientific literature, the lingzhi mushroom is ambiguously referred to as:

- Ganoderma sichuanense — the currently accepted name, described by Zhao and Zhang (1983).
- Ganoderma lingzhi — described by Cao et al. (2012) as a novel species that may be the best fit for traditional definitions of the lingzhi mushroom. However, Du et al. (2023) found that it is the same species as G. sichuanense, so it is now treated as a later synonym.
- Ganoderma lucidum — the type species of Ganoderma was first described in 1781 by Curtis as Boletus lucidus based on European collections. In 1881 Karst designated it as the type species of his new genus Ganoderma, as Ganoderma lucidum. Early literature used G. lucidum for collections from China, but it was later established that Asian populations are distinct from European, both morphologically and phylogenetically. As the lingzhi fungus is strongly rooted in culture, the old name persists, even though it is well established that G. sichuanense and G. lucidum are distinct species.

One source employed to solve the task of identifying the traditional lingzhi mushroom is the 16th century Chinese herbal compendium, the Bencao Gangmu (1578). There, a number of different lingzhi-like mushrooms defined by color were used for different purposes. No exact current species can be attached to these ancient lingzhi for certain, but according to Dai et al. (2017), as well as other researchers, and based on molecular work, red lingzhi is most likely to be Ganoderma sichuanense.

Ganoderma sichuanense is the most widely found species in Chinese herb shops today, and the fruiting bodies are widely cultivated in China and shipped to many other countries. About 7–10 other Ganoderma species are also sold in some shops, but have different Chinese and Latin names, and are considered different in their activity and functions. The differences are based on concentrations of triterpenes such as ganoderic acid and its derivatives, which vary widely among species. Research on the genus is ongoing, but a number of recent phylogenetic analyses have been published in recent years.

=== Nomenclature ===
Petter Adolf Karsten first described the genus Ganoderma in 1881. He designated as its type species a European fungus named Boletus lucidus by English botanist William Curtis in 1781. Since then, many other Ganoderma species have been described.

The lingzhi's botanical names have Greek and Latin roots. Ganoderma derives from the Greek ganos (γανος; 'brightness'), and derma (δερμα; 'skin; together; shining skin'). The specific epithet, sichuanense, comes from the Sichuan Chinese province. The common name, lingzhi, comes from Chinese, meaning 'divine mushroom'.

=== Varieties ===
It was once thought that G. lingzhi generally occurred in two growth forms: a large, sessile, specimen with a small or nonexistent stalk, found in North America, and a smaller specimen with a long, narrow stalk, found mainly in the tropics. However, recent molecular evidence has identified the former, stalkless, form as a distinct species called G. sessile, a name given to North American specimens by William Alfonso Murrill in 1902.

Environmental conditions play a substantial role in the lingzhi's manifest morphological characteristics. For example, elevated carbon dioxide levels result in stem elongation in lingzhi. Other formations include antlers without a cap, which may also be related to carbon dioxide levels. The three main factors that influence fruit body development morphology are light, temperature, and humidity. While water and air quality play a role in fruit body development morphology, they do so to a lesser degree.

== Distribution and habitat ==
Ganoderma lingzhi is found in East Asia growing as a parasite or saprotroph on a variety of trees. Ganoderma curtisii and Ganoderma ravenelii are the closest relatives of the lingzhi mushroom in North America.

In the wild, lingzhi grows at the base and stumps of deciduous trees, especially maples. Today, lingzhi is effectively cultivated on sawdust, woodchips, and hardwood logs.

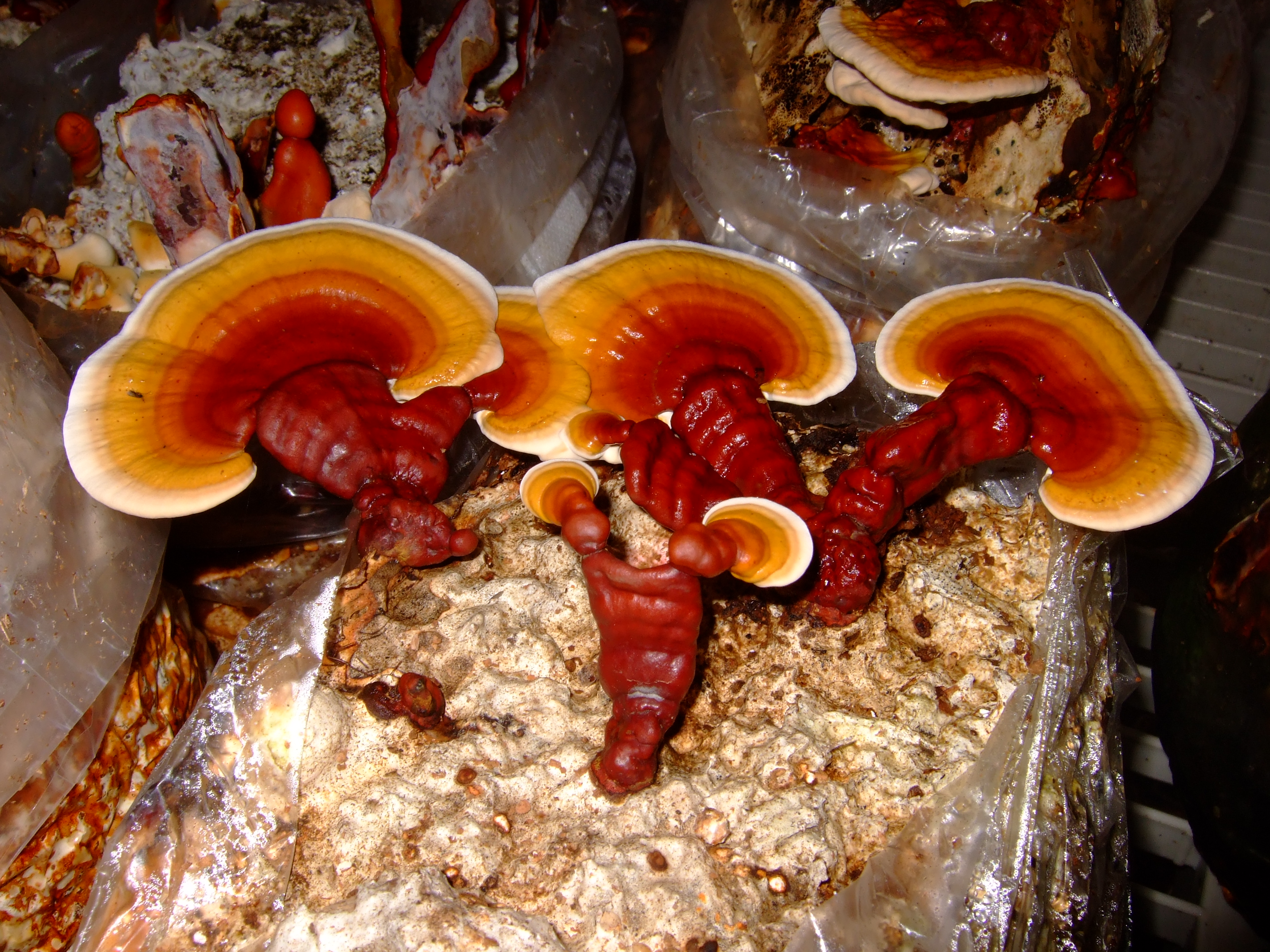
Grown lingzhi mushroom

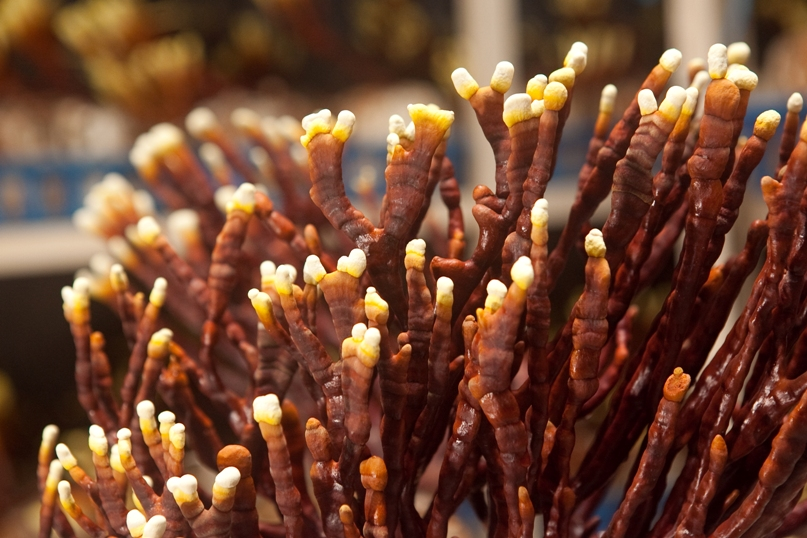
Depending on growing conditions, lingzhi may resemble antlers, with no umbrella cap.

== Uses ==
=== Chemistry ===
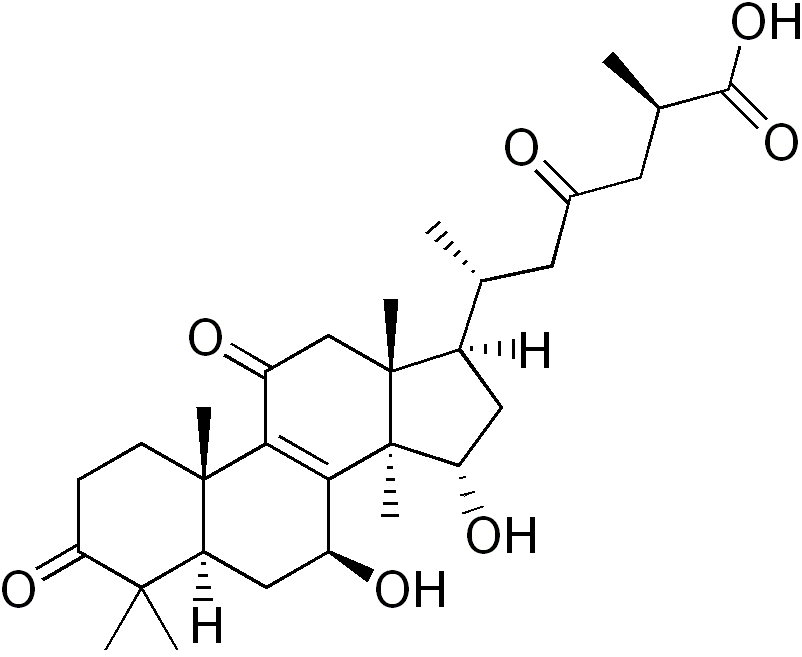
Ganoderic acid A, a compound isolated from lingzhi

Ganoderma lucidum contains diverse chemicals, including triterpenes (ganoderic acids), which have a molecular structure similar to that of steroid hormones. It also contains phytochemicals found in fungal materials, including polysaccharides (such as beta-glucan), coumarin, mannitol, and alkaloids. Sterols isolated from the mushroom include ganoderol, ganoderenic acid, ganoderiol, ganodermanontriol, lucidadiol, and ganodermadiol.

=== Folk medicine ===
Because of its bitter taste, lingzhi is traditionally prepared as a hot water extract product for use in folk medicine. Thinly sliced or pulverized lingzhi (either fresh or dried) is added to boiling water which is then reduced to a simmer, covered, and left for 2 hours. The resulting liquid is dark and fairly bitter in taste. The red lingzhi is often more bitter than the black. The process is sometimes repeated to increase the concentration. Alternatively, it can be used as an ingredient in a formula decoction, or used to make an extract (in liquid, capsule, or powder form).

=== Other uses ===
Lingzhi is commercially manufactured and sold. Since the early 1970s, most lingzhi is cultivated. Lingzhi can grow on substrates such as sawdust, grain, and wood logs. After formation of the fruiting body, lingzhi is most commonly harvested, dried, ground, and processed into tablets or capsules to be directly ingested or made into tea or soup. Other lingzhi products include processed fungal mycelia or spores. Lingzhi is also used to create mycelium bricks.

== Cultural significance ==
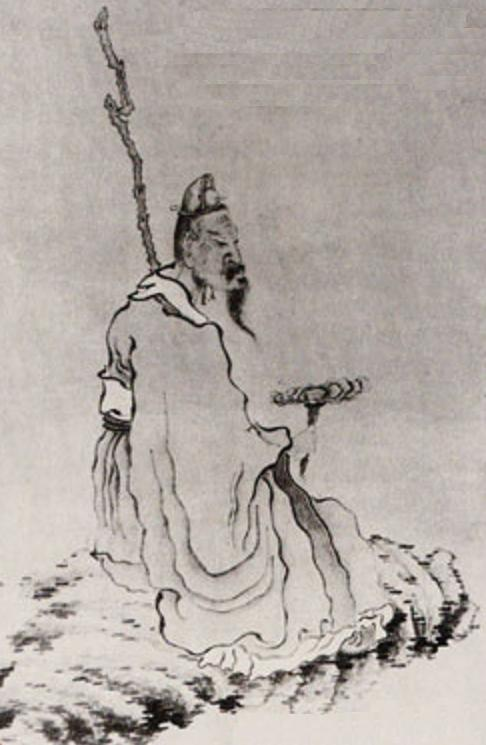
Tao Yuanming holding Lingzhi by Chen Hongshou

In the chronicles of Shiji (1st century CE from Sima Qian), the initial use of nearby separately related words with Chinese: 芝 and Chinese: 靈 are attested to in the poems of Emperor Wu of Han. Later, in the 1st century CE through the poetry of Ban Gu, occurred the first combination of the characters 靈芝 together into a single word, in an ode dedicated to Lingzhi.

Since ancient times, Taoist temples were called "the abode of mushrooms" and according to their mystical teachings, the use of woody mushrooms zhi (Ganoderma) or lingzhi "spirits mushroom", in particular making from it a concentrated decoction of hallucinogenic action, gave followers the opportunity to see spirits or become spirits themselves by receiving the magical energy of the immortals xians, located on the "fields of grace" in the heavenly "mushroom fields" (zhi tian).

In the philosophical work Huainanzi, it is said that the lingzhi mushroom is personification of nobility; from which shamans brewed a psychedelic drink.

The Shennong bencao jing (Divine Farmer's Classic of Pharmaceutics) of c. 200–250 CE classifies zhi into six color categories, each of which is believed to benefit the qi, or "life force", in a different part of the body: qingzhi (青芝; 'green mushroom') for the liver, chizhi (赤芝; 'red mushroom') for the heart, huangzhi (黃芝; 'yellow mushroom') for the spleen, baizhi (白芝; 'white mushroom') for the lungs, heizhi (黑芝; 'black mushroom') for the kidneys, and zizhi (紫芝; 'purple mushroom') for the Essence. Commentators identify the red chizhi, or danzhi (丹芝; 'cinnabar mushroom'), as the lingzhi.

Chi Zhi (Ganoderma rubra) is bitter and balanced. It mainly treats binding in the chest, boosts the heart qi, supplements the center, sharpens the wits, and [causes people] not to forget [i.e., improves the memory]. Protracted taking may make the body light, prevent senility, and prolong life so as to make one an immortal. Its other name is Dan Zhi (Cinnabar Ganoderma). It grows in mountains and valleys.

In the Taoist treatise of Baopuzi from Ge Hong, the lingzhi is used for immortality.

The (1596) Bencao Gangmu (Compendium of Materia Medica) has a Zhi (芝) category that includes six types of zhi (calling the green, red, yellow, white, black, and purple mushrooms of the Shennong bencao jing the liuzhi (六芝; "six mushrooms") and sixteen other fungi, mushrooms, and lichens, including mu'er (木耳; "wood ear"; "cloud ear fungus", Auricularia auricula-judae). The author Li Shizhen classified these six differently colored zhi as xiancao (仙草; "immortality herbs"), and described the effects of chizhi ("red mushroom"):

It positively affects the life-energy, or Qi of the heart, repairing the chest area and benefiting those with a knotted and tight chest. Taken over a long period of time, the agility of the body will not cease, and the years are lengthened to those of the Immortal Fairies.

Chinese herbology describes the zhi.

芝 (Chih) is defined in the classics as the plant of immortality, and it is therefore always considered to be a felicitous one. It is said to absorb the earthy vapors and to leave a heavenly atmosphere. For this reason, it is called 靈芝 (Ling-chih.) It is large and of a branched form, and probably represents Clavaria or Sparassis. Its form is likened to that of coral.

The Bencao Gangmu does not list lingzhi as a variety of zhi, but as an alternate name for the shi'er (石耳; "stone ear", Umbilicaria esculenta) lichen. According to Stuart and Smith,

[The 石耳 Shih-erh is] edible, and has all of the good qualities of the 芝 (Chih), it is also being used in the treatment of gravel, and said to benefit virility. It is specially used in hemorrhage from the bowels and prolapse of the rectum. While the name of this would indicate that it was one of the Auriculariales, the fact that the name 靈芝 (Ling-chih) is also given to it might place it among the Clavariaceae.

In Chinese art, the lingzhi symbolizes great health and longevity, as depicted in the imperial Forbidden City and Summer Palace. It was a talisman for luck in the traditional culture of China, and the goddess of healing Guanyin is sometimes depicted holding a lingzhi mushroom.

=== Regional names ===
Regional names

Historical name
- Traditional Chinese: 靈芝
- Literal meaning: spirit mushroom
- Middle Chinese: /leŋ.t͡ɕɨ/
- Zhengzhang: /*reːŋ.tjɯ/

Chinese name
- Traditional Chinese: 靈芝
- Simplified Chinese: 灵芝
- Hanyu Pinyin: língzhī
- Wade–Giles: ling^{2}-chih^{1}
- Jyutping: ling^{4} zi^{1}

Vietnamese name
- Vietnamese: linh chi
- Chữ Nôm: 靈芝

Thai name
- Thai: หลินจือ
- RTGS: lin chue

Korean name
- Hangul: 영지
- Hanja: 靈芝
- Revised Romanization: yeongji
- McCune–Reischauer: yŏngji

Japanese name
- Kanji: 霊芝
- Hiragana: れいし
- Katakana: レイシ
- Revised Hepburn: reishi

==== Chinese ====
The Old Chinese name for lingzhi 靈芝 was first recorded during the Han dynasty (206 BC – 9 AD). In the Chinese language, língzhī (靈芝) is a compound. It comprises líng (靈); "spirit, spiritual; soul; miraculous; sacred; divine; mysterious; efficacious; effective)" as, for example, in the name of the Lingyan Temple in Jinan, and zhī (芝); "(traditional) plant of longevity; fungus; seed; branch; mushroom; excrescence"). Fabrizio Pregadio notes, "The term zhi, which has no equivalent in Western languages, refers to a variety of supermundane substances often described as plants, fungi, or 'excrescences'." Zhi occurs in other Chinese plant names, such as zhīmá (芝麻; "sesame" or "seed"), and was anciently used a phonetic loan character for zhǐ (芷; "Angelica iris"). Chinese differentiates Ganoderma species into chìzhī (赤芝; "red mushroom") G. lingzhi, and zǐzhī (紫芝; "purple mushroom") Ganoderma sinense.

Lingzhi has several synonyms. Of these, ruìcǎo (瑞草; "auspicious plant") (ruì 瑞; "auspicious; felicitous omen" with the suffix cǎo 草; "plant; herb") is the oldest; the Erya dictionary (c. 3rd century BCE) defines xiú 苬, interpreted as a miscopy of jūn (菌; "mushroom") as zhī (芝; "mushroom"), and the commentary of Guo Pu (276–324) says, "The [zhi] flowers three times in one year. It is a [ruicao] felicitous plant." Other Chinese names for Ganoderma include ruìzhī (瑞芝; "auspicious mushroom"), shénzhī (神芝; "divine mushroom", with shen; "spirit; god' supernatural; divine"), mùlíngzhī (木靈芝) (with "tree; wood"), xiāncǎo (仙草; "immortality plant", with xian; "(Daoism) transcendent; immortal; wizard"), and língzhīcǎo (靈芝草) or zhīcǎo (芝草; "mushroom plant").

Since both Chinese ling and zhi have multiple meanings, lingzhi has diverse English translations. Renditions include "[zhi] possessed of soul power", "Herb of Spiritual Potency" or "Mushroom of Immortality", "Numinous Mushroom", "divine mushroom", "divine fungus", "Magic Fungus", and "Marvelous Fungus".

==== English ====
In English, lingzhi or ling chih (sometimes spelled "ling chi", using the French EFEO Chinese transcription) is a Chinese loanword. It is commonly referred to as "reishi", which is loaned from Japanese.

The Oxford English Dictionary (OED) gives the definition, "The fungus Ganoderma lucidum (actually Ganoderma lingzhi (see Ganoderma lucidum for details), believed in China to confer longevity and used as a symbol of this on Chinese ceramic ware.", and identifies the etymology of the word as Chinese: líng, "divine" + zhī, "fungus". According to the OED, the earliest recorded usage of the Wade–Giles romanization ling chih is 1904, and of the Pinyin lingzhi is 1980.

In addition to the transliterated loanwords, English names include "glossy ganoderma" and "shiny polyporus".

==== Japanese ====
The Japanese word reishi (霊芝) is a Sino-Japanese loanword deriving from the Chinese língzhī (灵芝; 靈芝). Its modern Japanese kanji, 霊, is the shinjitai ("new character form") of the kyūjitai ("old character form"), 靈. Synonyms for reishi are divided between Sino-Japanese borrowings and native Japanese coinages. Sinitic loanwords include literary terms such as zuisō (瑞草, from ruìcǎo; "auspicious plant") and sensō (仙草, from xiāncǎo; "immortality plant"). The Japanese writing system uses shi or shiba (芝) for "grass; lawn; turf", and take or kinoko (茸) for "mushroom" (e.g., shiitake). A common native Japanese name is mannentake (万年茸; "10,000-year mushroom"). Other Japanese terms for reishi include kadodetake (門出茸; "departure mushroom"), hijiridake (聖茸; "sage mushroom"), and magoshakushi (孫杓子; "grandchild ladle").

==== Korean ====
The Korean name, yeongji (Korean: 영지; Hanja: 靈芝) is also borrowed from, so a cognate with, the Chinese word língzhī (灵芝; 靈芝). It is often called yeongjibeoseot (영지버섯; "yeongji mushroom") in Korean, with the addition of the native word beoseot (버섯) meaning "mushroom". Other common names include bullocho (불로초; 不老草; "elixir grass") and jicho (지초; 芝草). According to color, yeongji mushrooms can be classified as jeokji (적지; 赤芝) for "red", jaji (자지; 紫芝) for "purple", heukji (흑지; 黑芝) for "black", cheongji (청지; 靑芝) for "blue" or "green", baekji (백지; 白芝) for "white", and hwangji (황지; 黃芝) for "yellow". South Korea produces over 25,000 tons of mushrooms every year.

==== Thai ====
The Thai word het lin chue (เห็ดหลินจือ) is a compound of the native word het (เห็ด) meaning "mushroom" and the loanword lin chue (หลินจือ) from the Chinese língzhī (灵芝; 靈芝).

==== Vietnamese ====
The Vietnamese language word linh chi is a loanword from Chinese. It is often used with nấm, the Vietnamese word for "mushroom", thus nấm linh chi is the equivalent of "lingzhi mushroom".
