= C30H48O2 =

The molecular formula C_{30}H_{48}O_{2} (molar mass: 440.71 g/mol) may refer to:

- Ganodermadiol
- Daturaolone
