= C30H46O2 =

The molecular formula C_{30}H_{46}O_{2} (molar mass: 438.70 g/mol) may refer to:

- Momordicinin
- Ganoderol A
