= King of herbs =

The phrase "king of herbs" may refer to:

- Reishi mushroom (Ganoderma lucidum)
- Basil (Ocimum basilicum)
- Ginseng (Panax ginseng)
- Soma
- Tarragon (Artemisia dracunculus)
