= Cassock Spring =

Karst spring in Jinan, Shandong Province, China

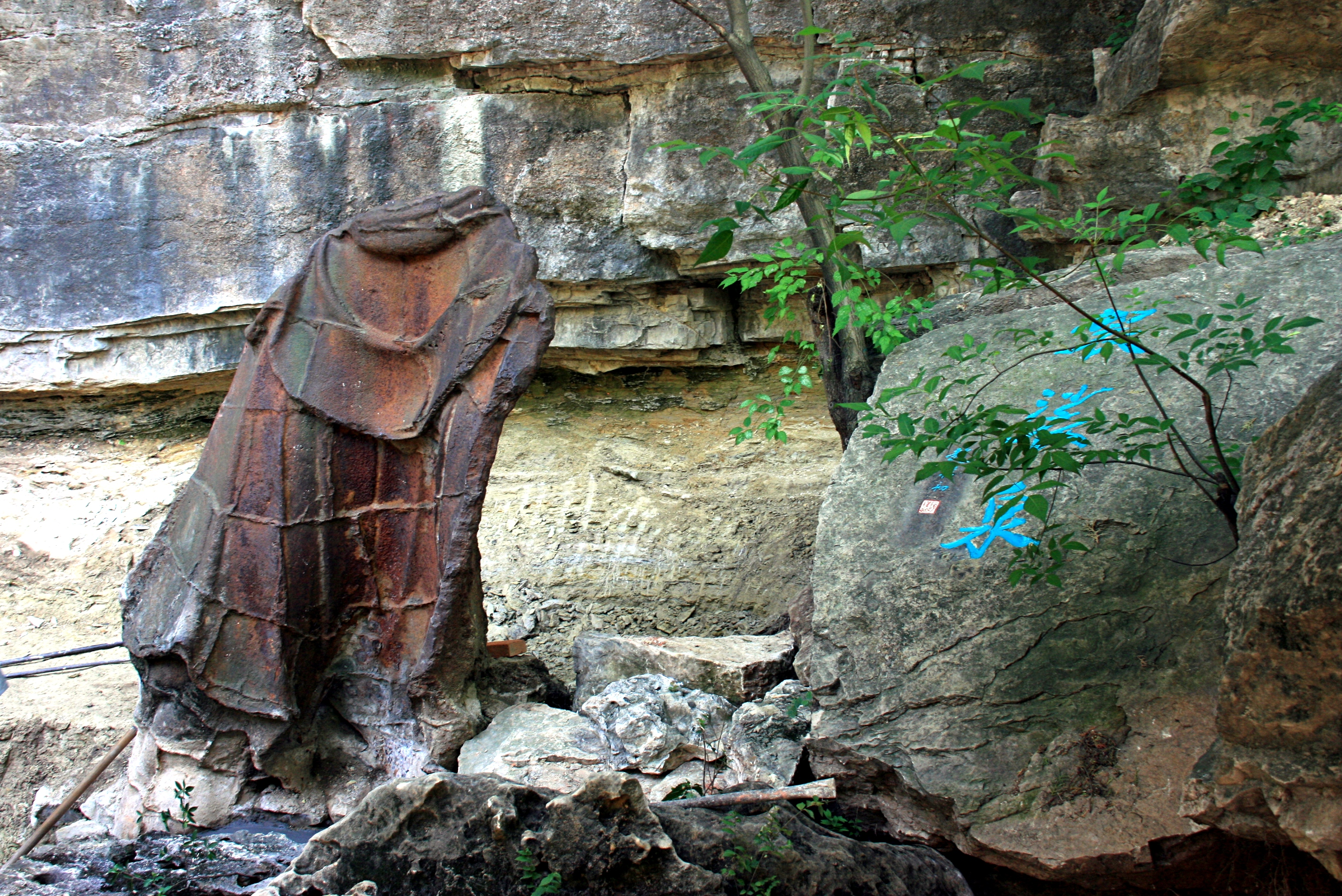
- Chinese: 袈裟泉
Transcriptions
Standard Mandarin
- Hanyu Pinyin: Jiāshā Quán

The Cassock Spring, also called Dugu Spring or Yinquan Spring, is a culturally significant artesian karst spring on the grounds of the Lingyan Temple in the city of Jinan, Shandong Province, China. The name Cassock Spring refers to a piece of cast iron that is positioned at the edge of the spring pool and resembles a cassock. The Cassock Spring is listed among the "seventy-two famous springs" (Chinese: 七十二名泉; pinyin: Qīshí'èr Míng Quán), a list of springs in Jinan that has been kept and updated since the times of the Jin, Ming, and Qing Dynasties.

== See also ==
- List of sites in Jinan
