= Pizhi Pagoda =

Pagoda in Shandong, China

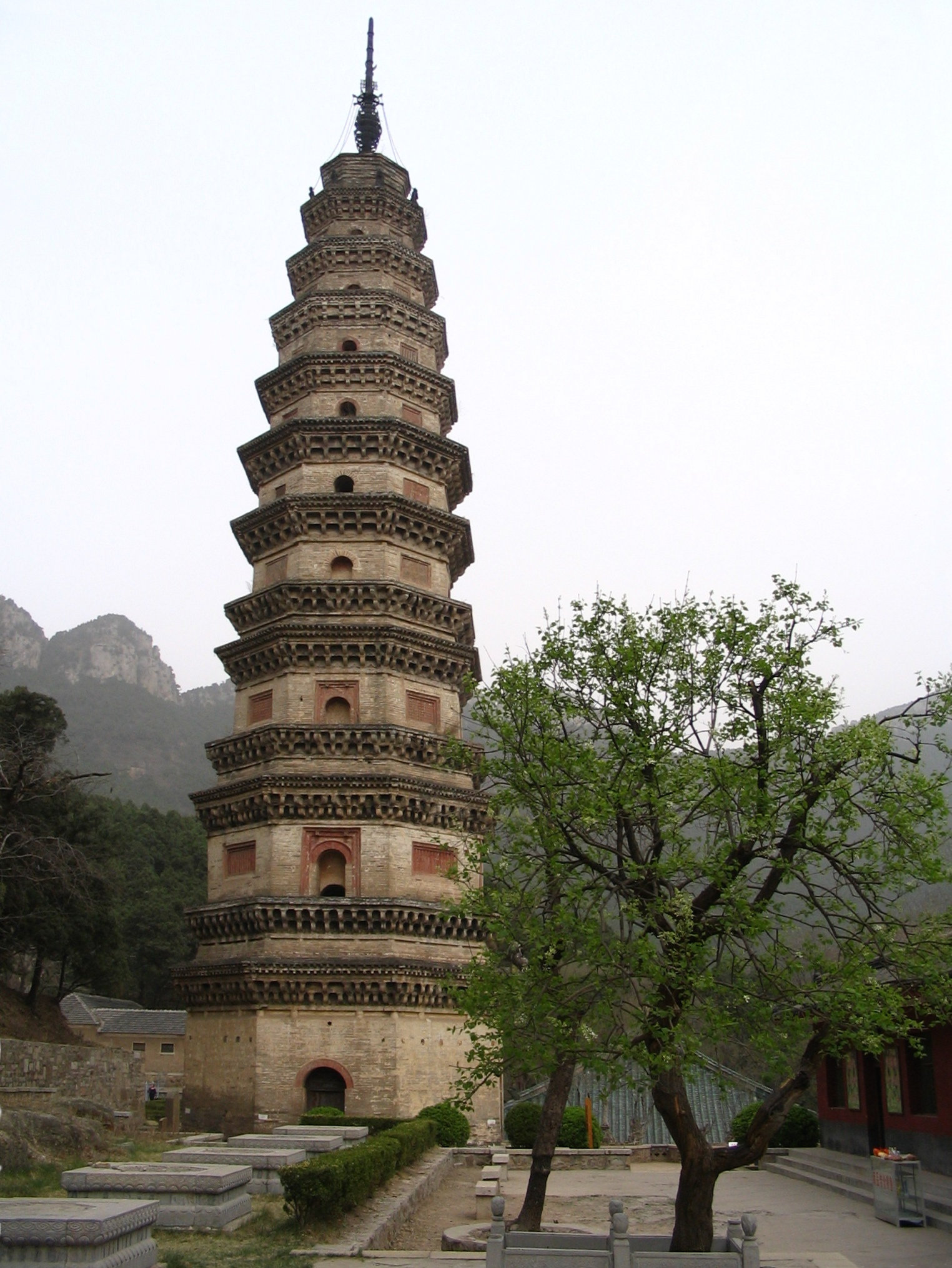
- Pizhi Pagoda, 54 m (177 ft) in height, built by 1063

- Lingyan Temple, Changqing, near Jinan, Shandong province, China Pizhi Pagoda (China)

Religion
- Affiliation: Buddhism

Location
- Country: Shandong province, China
- Coordinates: 36.36332°N 116.97768°E

Architecture
- Founder: Emperor Xuanzong of Tang
- Completed: 753

The Pizhi Pagoda (Chinese: 辟支塔; pinyin: Pìzhī Tǎ) is an 11th-century Chinese pagoda located at Lingyan Temple, Changqing, near Jinan, Shandong province, China. Although originally built in 753 during the reign of Emperor Xuanzong of Tang (r. 712–756), the present pagoda is a Song dynasty reconstruction from 1056 until 1063, during the last reigning years of Emperor Renzong of Song (r. 1022–1063). This octagonal-based, nine-story-tall, brick-and-stone pagoda stands at a height of 54 m (177 ft).

== Etymology ==
The Chinese word "pizhi" is a translation of the Sanskrit word pratyeka. The pratyeka is a type of buddha, a loner personality and one who has attained enlightenment after the death of the Sakyamuni Buddha. This is achieved by self-study and self-cultivation without the aid of Buddhist teachers or guides. Thus, the Pizhi Pagoda was built by the Song Chinese of the 11th century in dedication of these pratyeka, which is a rarity among pagodas in China.

== Features ==
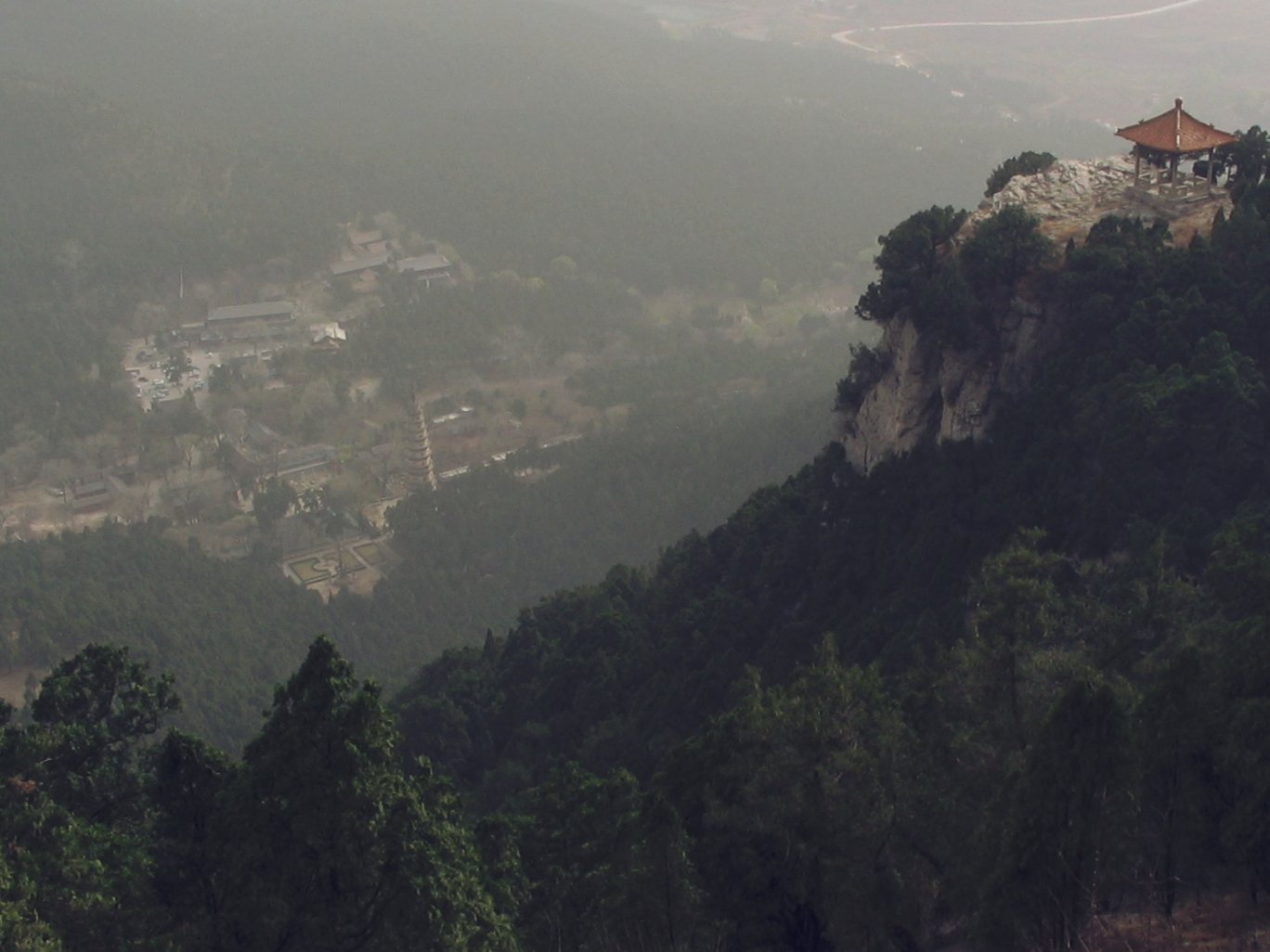
From a cliffside of nearby Mount Tai, a view onto Lingyan Temple and Pizhi Pagoda.

The basic structure of the pagoda is built of brick, although the exterior facade has carved stone elements. At the base of the pagoda is a stone pedestal carved on four sides with scenes of the Buddhist afterlife and torture scenes in Hell. The first, second, and third stories feature balconies supported by typical Chinese dougong brackets. From the fourth story until the ninth, there are only pent roofs and no balconies. The iron steeple crowning the top of the pagoda is composed of an inverted bowl, discs, a sun, a crescent, and a bead. Iron chains are used to keep the steeple firmly into place on the rooftop. Small iron statues of celestial guards were positioned on the corner ridges by each of the chains, which was believed to keep the chains firmly into place. A large brick pillar and brick stairway lead all the way up to the fifth floor, but only the winding staircase outside the pagoda allows one to traverse all the way to the top where the steeple is located. This arrangement is often seen in stone pagodas, but rarely in brick ones.

== See also ==
- Architecture of the Song dynasty
- Chinese architecture
- Chinese Buddhism
