= Ganoderenic acid =

Acid

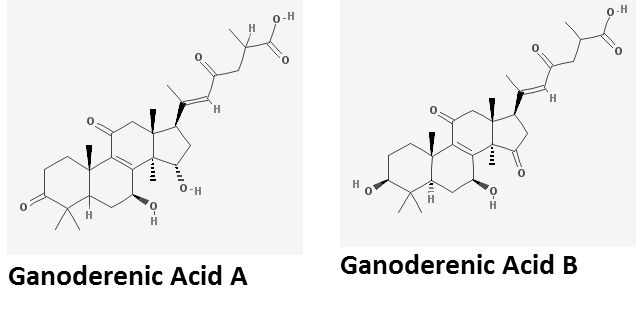

Ganoderenic acids are bio-active sterols isolated from Ganoderma lucidum.
