= Ganoderic acid =

Ganoderic acid A
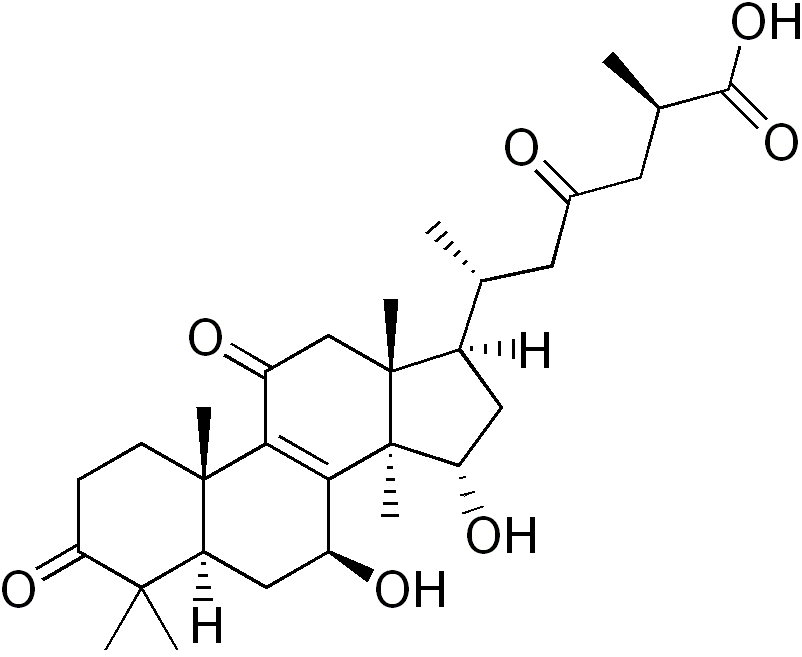

Names
- IUPAC name (25R)-7β,15α-Dihydroxy-3,11,23-trioxolanost-8-en-26-oic acid
- Systematic IUPAC name (2R,6R)-6-[(1R,3S,3aR,4S,5aR,9aS,11aR)-3,4-Dihydroxy-3a,6,6,9a,11a-pentamethyl-7,10-dioxo-2,3,3a,4,5,5a,6,7,8,9,9a,10,11,11a-tetradecahydro-1H-cyclopenta[a]phenanthren-1-yl]-2-methyl-4-oxoheptanoic acid

Identifiers
CAS Number	81907-62-2
3D model (JSmol)	Interactive image
ChemSpider	413668
PubChem CID	471002
UNII	548G37DF65
CompTox Dashboard (EPA)	DTXSID80903984
- InChI: InChI=1S/C30H44O7/c1-15(10-17(31)11-16(2)26(36)37)18-12-23(35)30(7)25-19(32)13-21-27(3,4)22(34)8-9-28(21,5)24(25)20(33)14-29(18,30)6/h15-16,18-19,21,23,32,35H,8-14H2,1-7H3,(H,36,37)/t15-,16-,18-,19+,21+,23+,28+,29-,30+/m1/s1 Key: DYOKDAQBNHPJFD-JNTBEZBXSA-N; InChI=1/C30H44O7/c1-15(10-17(31)11-16(2)26(36)37)18-12-23(35)30(7)25-19(32)13-21-27(3,4)22(34)8-9-28(21,5)24(25)20(33)14-29(18,30)6/h15-16,18-19,21,23,32,35H,8-14H2,1-7H3,(H,36,37)/t15-,16-,18-,19+,21+,23+,28+,29-,30+/m1/s1 Key: DYOKDAQBNHPJFD-JNTBEZBXBK
- SMILES: OC(=O)[C@H](C)CC(=O)C[C@@H](C)[C@H]2C[C@H](O)[C@@]1(C)C/3=C(\C(=O)C[C@@]12C)[C@@]4(C)CCC(=O)[C@](C)(C)[C@@H]4C[C@@H]\3O

Properties
Chemical formula	C_{30}H_{44}O_{7}
Molar mass	516.67
- Except where otherwise noted, data are given for materials in their standard state (at 25 °C [77 °F], 100 kPa). verify (what is ?) Infobox references

Ganoderic acids are a class of closely related triterpenoids (derivatives from lanosterol) found in Ganoderma mushrooms. For thousands of years, the fruiting bodies of Ganoderma fungi have been used in traditional medicines in East Asia. Consequently, there have been efforts to identify the chemical constituents that may be responsible for the putative pharmacological effects. The two most well described ganoderic acids out of the many that have been identified and characterized are ganoderic acids A and B. Ganoderic acids have been examined for a number of biological activities including hepatoprotection, anti-tumor effects, and 5-alpha reductase inhibition.
