= Lingyan Temple (Jinan) =

Buddhist temple in Jinan, China

Coordinates: 36°21′46″N 116°58′41″E

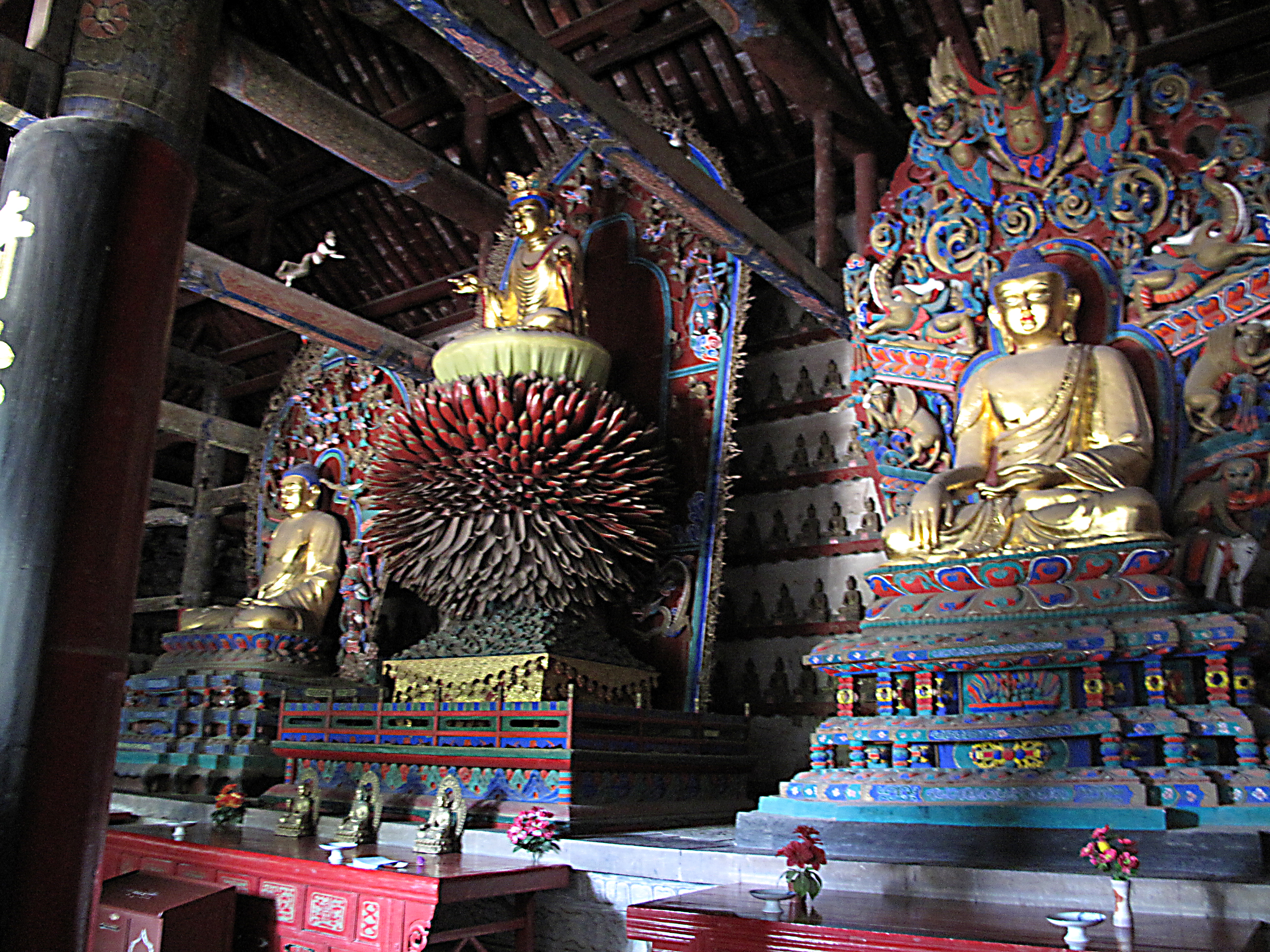
The Qiānfó-diàn (Thousand Buddha Hall) enshrines Ming dynasty statues of Vairocana (center), Amitabha (left) and Bhaisajyaguru (right). The projecting tongues from Vairocana's "puffball" throne are petals that symbolize his radiance in infinite directions.

Lingyan Temple (simplified Chinese: 灵岩寺; traditional Chinese: 靈巖寺; pinyin: Língyán Sì; lit. 'Temple of the Spiritual Rocks') is a Buddhist temple located in Changqing District, Jinan, Shandong Province, China, about 20 kilometres (12 mi) north of the city of Tai'an. The temple grounds are situated in a valley on the western edge of the Taishan range. The Lingyan Temple has a long recorded history, and was one of the main temples in China during the times of the Tang and Song Dynasties. Its most renowned landmarks are the 11th century Pìzhī-tǎ (辟支塔; "Pizhi Pagoda") and the Qiānfó-diàn (千佛殿, "Thousand Buddha Hall") which houses a Ming dynasty bronze Buddha statue as well as 40 painted clay statues of life-size luohan from the Song dynasty.

== History ==
The original temple was established in the Yongxing reign period (357–358), during the reign of Fú Jiān (r. 357–385) of the Former Qin state. Gaining a greater reputation during the Northern Wei (386–534), the temple reached its apex of importance during the Tang dynasty (618–907) and Song dynasty (960–1279). There were over 40 different wooden temple halls located at the temple, composing more than 500 monastic rooms. More than 500 Buddhist monks lived at Lingyan Temple during its height. The oldest structures at the site are the various stone stupas and square-based stone Chinese pagoda in the pavilion style from the Tang dynasty, the 8th century Huichong Pagoda. Of the 167 stone stupas at the temple, no two are identical, and like the luohan statues of the Qiānfó-diàn, have been well preserved. The tallest structure of the temple is the 54 m (177 ft) tall Pìzhī-tǎ, built originally in 753, although the present structure was built from 1056 to 1063. Although the wooden halls were all reconstructed during the Ming dynasty (1368–1644) and Qing dynasty (1644–1912), the stone pedestals at the base of the pillars in the Qiānfó-diàn are the original work of the Tang and Song eras.

== Gallery ==
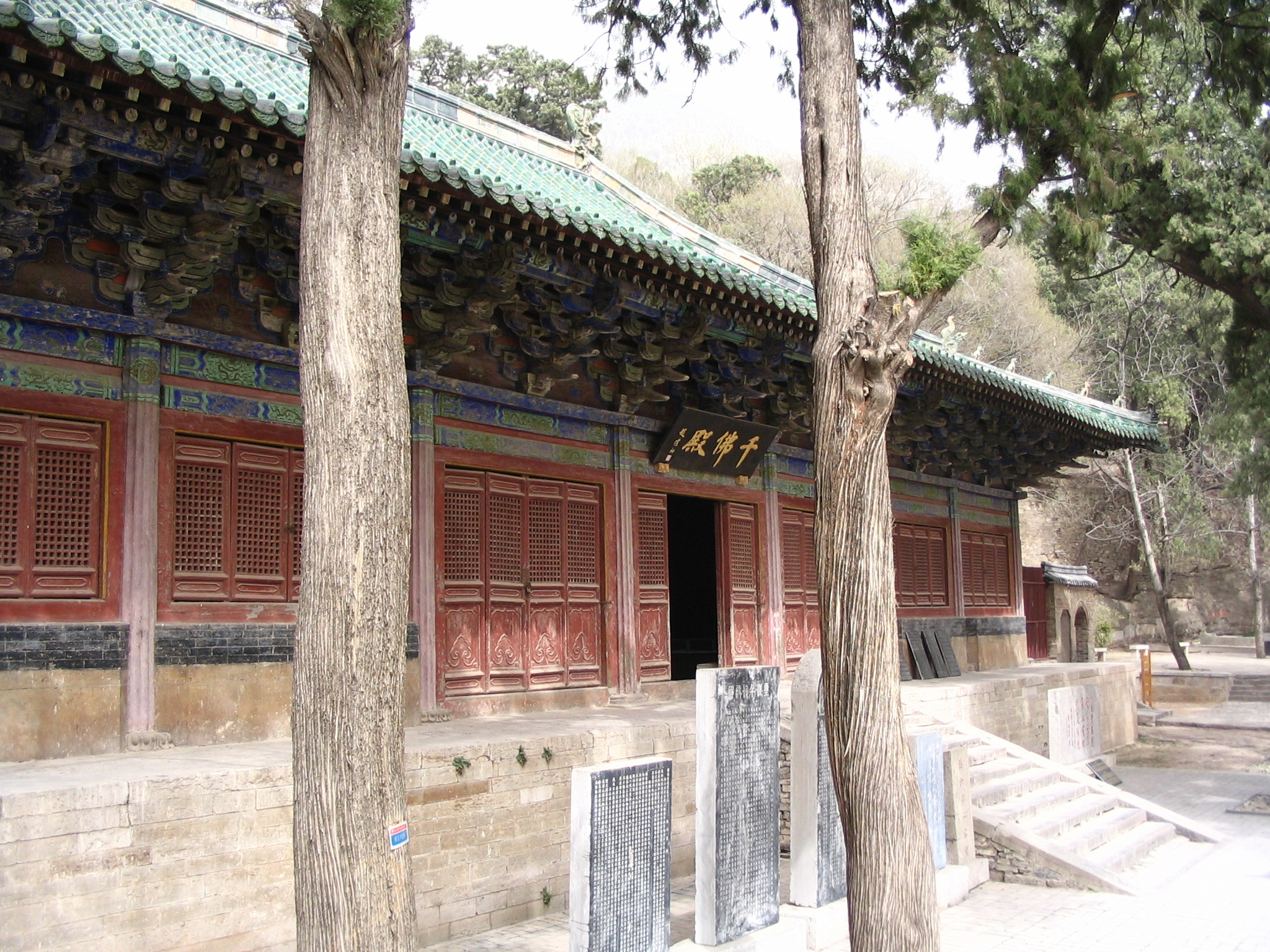
The exterior of the Qiānfó-diàn (Thousand Buddha Hall) of Lingyan Temple. Notice the elaborate dougong brackets supporting the pent, shingled roof.

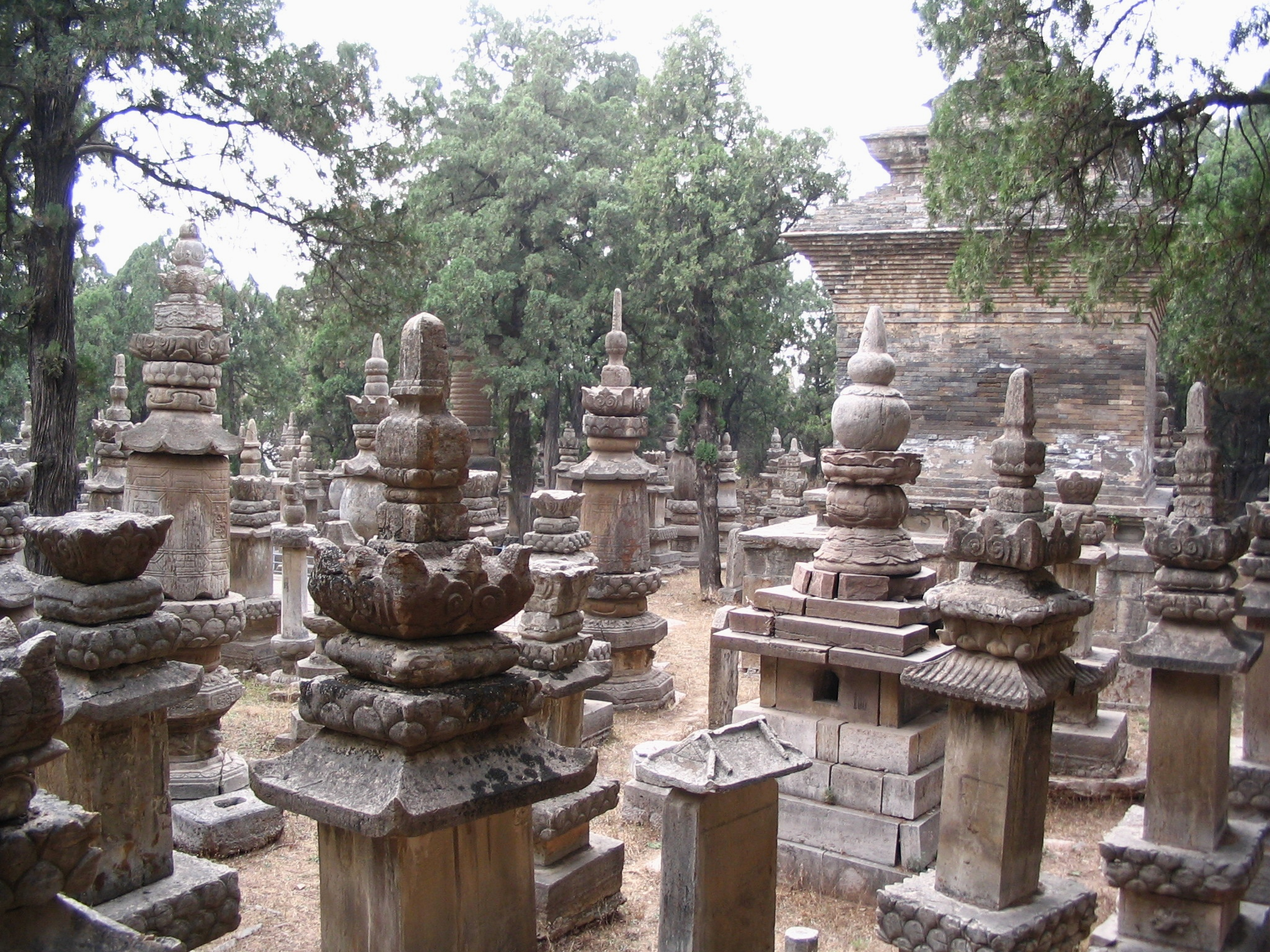
Some of the 167 stupas in the stupa forest at Lingyan, some as old as the Tang dynasty (618 - 907) while some date as late as the Qing dynasty (1644 - 1911).

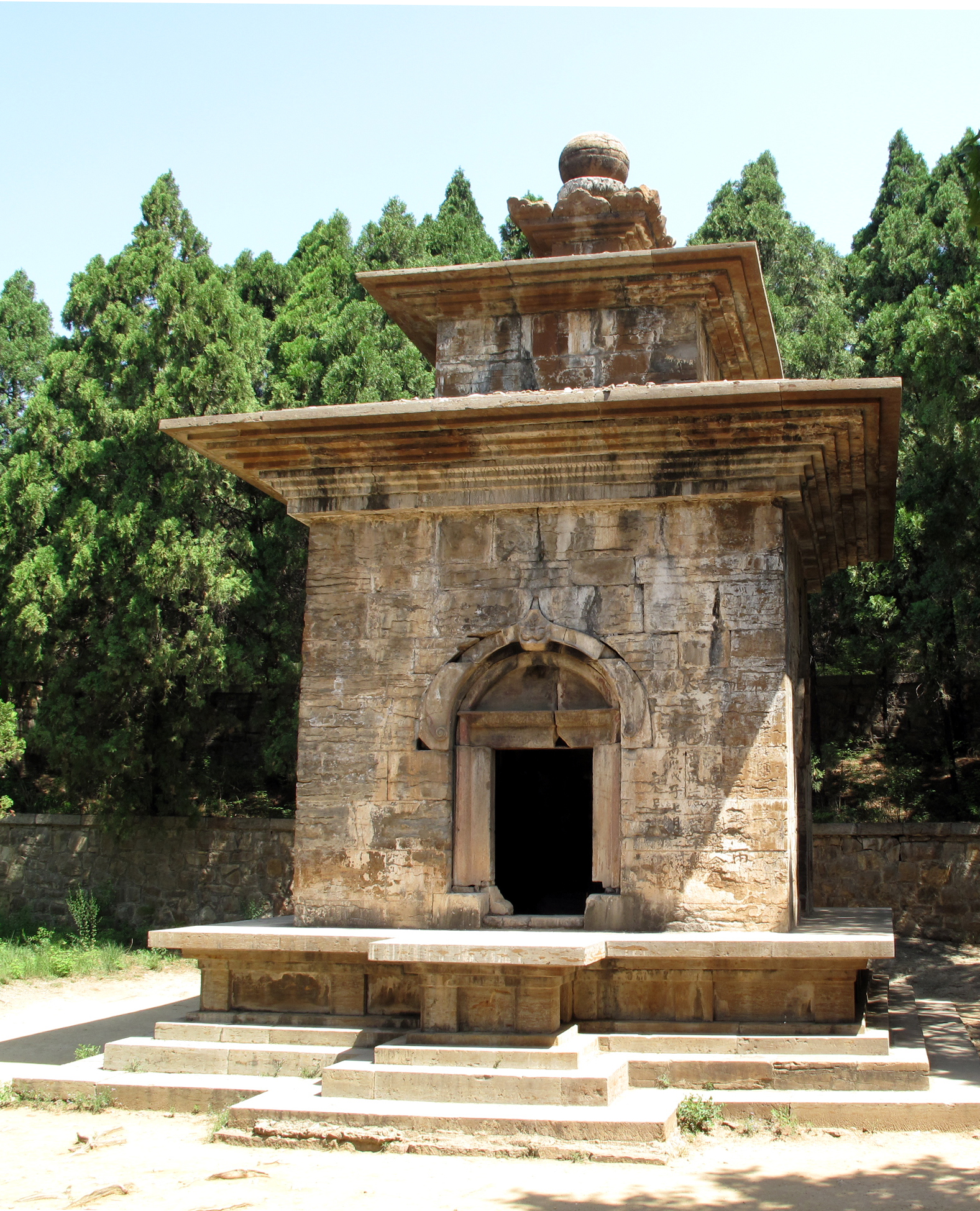
This squared stupa (742-755 AD, Tang dynasty) marks the burial of monk Hui Chong, who led the monastery during his lifetime.

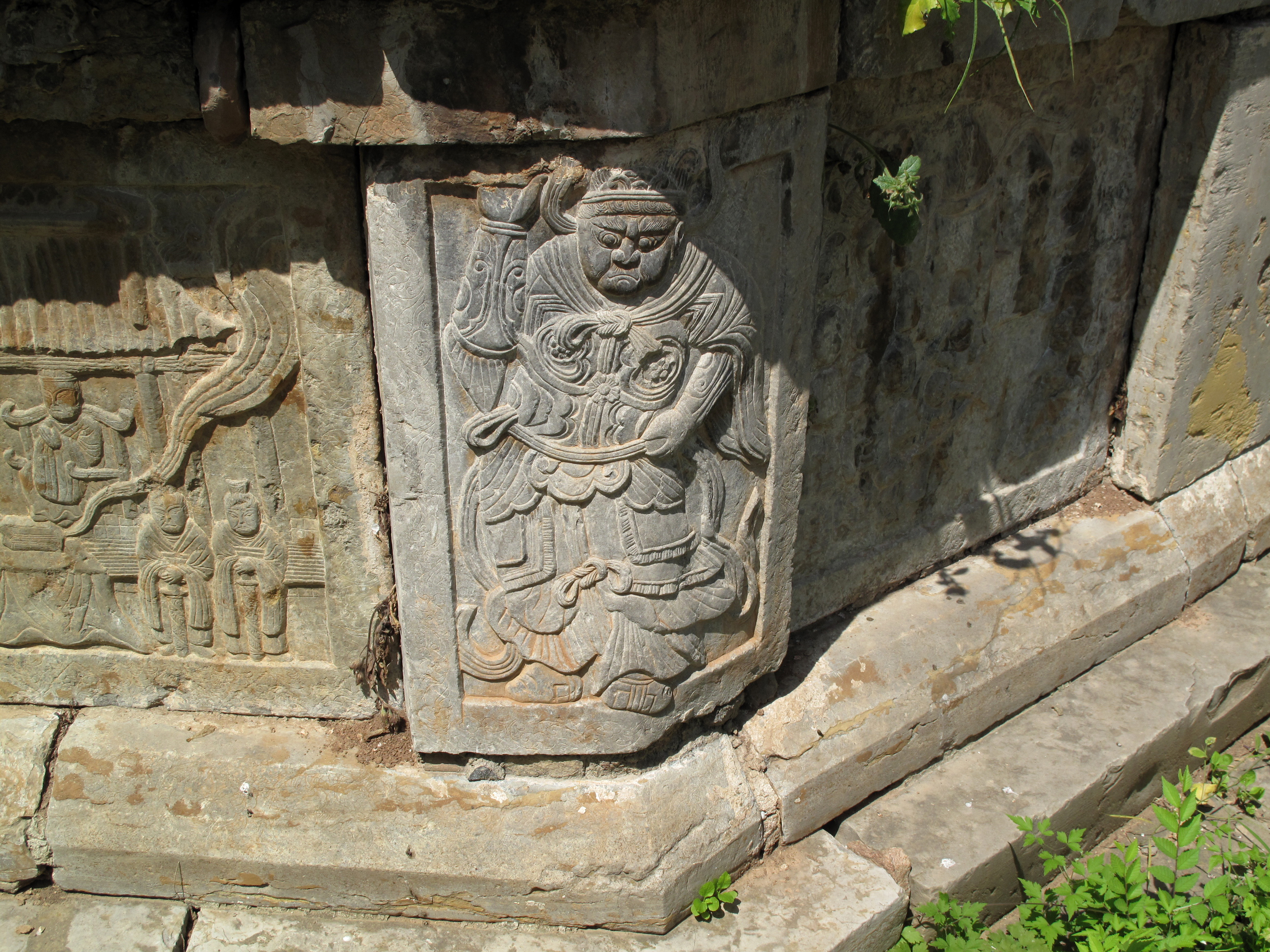
The corners of the pagoda display dour guardian telamons such as this, that symbolically hold up the entire structure

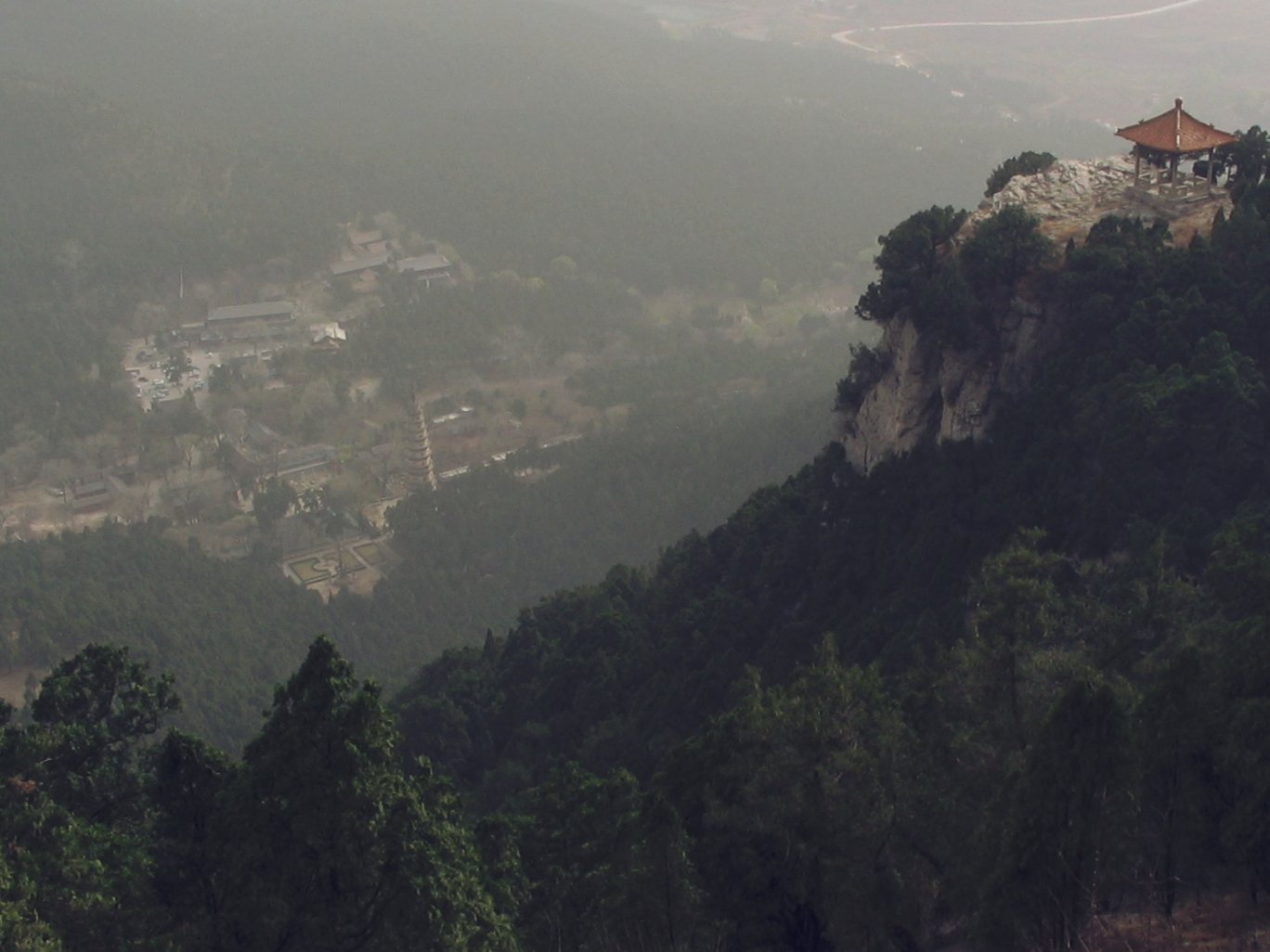
From a cliffside of nearby Mount Tai, a view onto Lingyan Temple and Pìzhī-tǎ (Pizhi Pagoda)

== See also ==
- Architecture of the Song dynasty
- List of sites in Jinan
- Cassock Spring
