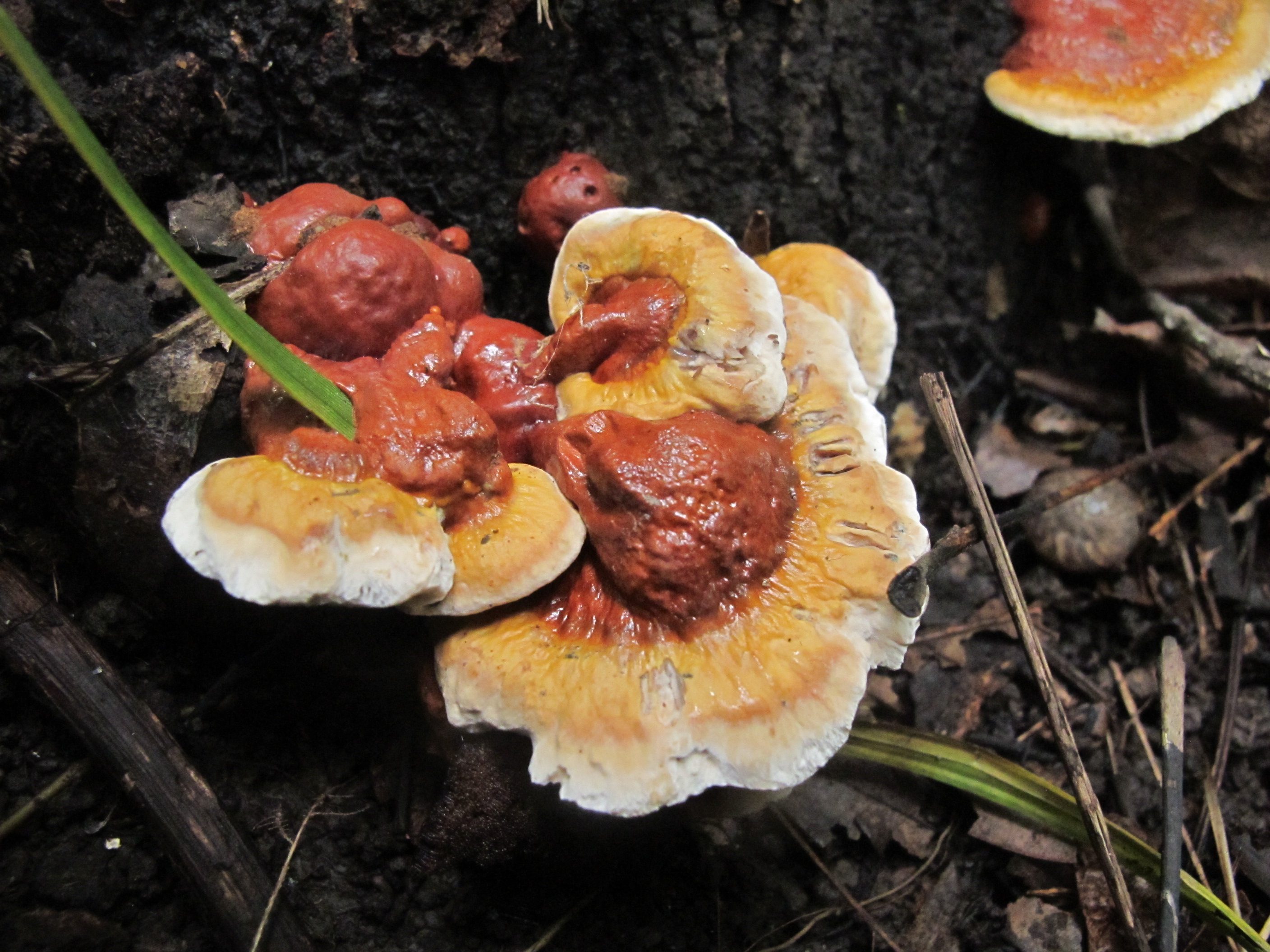

Scientific classification
- Kingdom: Fungi
- Division: Basidiomycota
- Class: Agaricomycetes
- Order: Polyporales
- Family: Ganodermataceae
- Genus: Ganoderma
- Species: G. sessile

Binomial name
- Ganoderma sessile Murrill (1902)

Synonyms
- Fomes sessilis (Murrill) Sacc. & D. Sacc.; Polyporus sessilis (Murrill) Lloyd; Ganoderma subperforatum Atkinson

= Ganoderma sessile =

Species of fungus

Ganoderma sessile is a species of polypore fungus in the Ganodermataceae family. There is taxonomic uncertainty with this fungus since its circumscription in 1902.

This wood decay fungus is found commonly in Eastern North America, and is associated with declining or dead hardwoods.

== Taxonomy ==
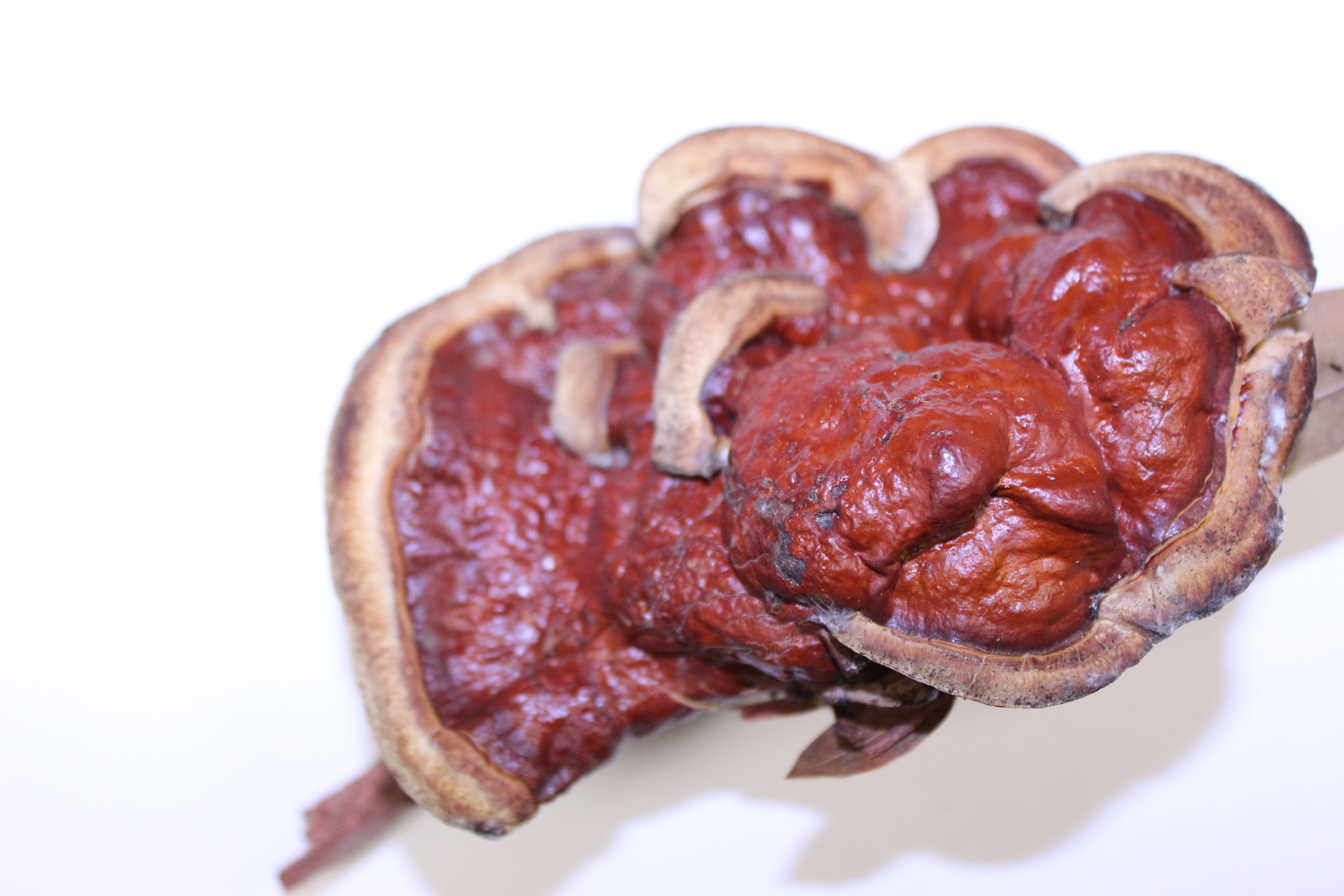
G. sessile basidiocarp

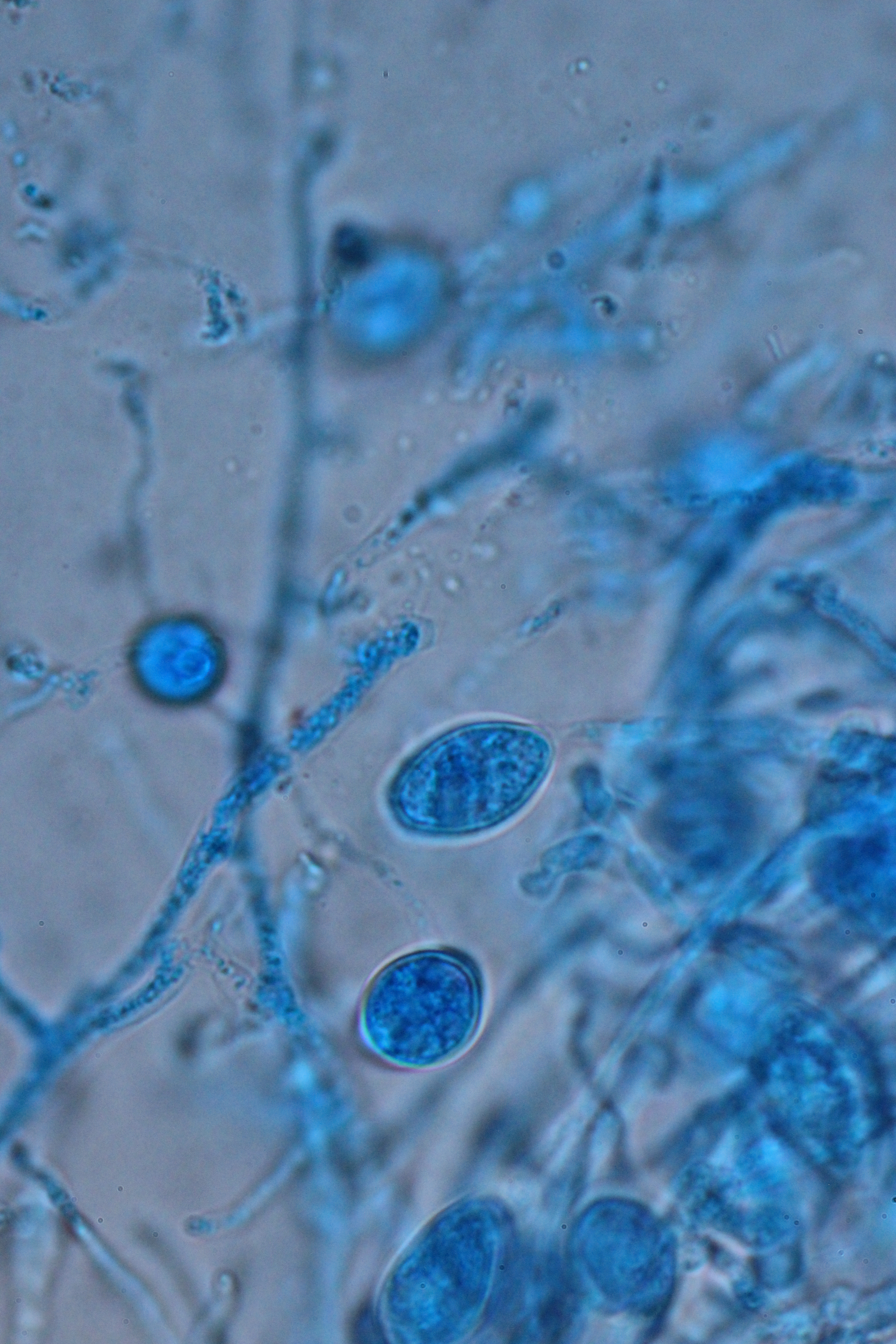
G. sessile chlamydospores stained in lactophenol cotton blue

Murrill described 17 new Ganoderma species in his treatises of North American polypores, including for example, G. oregonense, G. sessile, G. tsugae, G. tuberculosum and G. zonatum. Most notably and controversial was the typification of Ganoderma sessile, which was described from various hardwoods only in the United States. The specific epithet "sessile" comes from the sessile (without typical stem) nature of this species when found growing in a natural setting. Ganoderma sessile was distinguished based on a sessile fruiting habit, common on hardwood substrates and occasionally having a reduced, eccentric or "wanting" stipe. In 1908, Atkinson considered G. tsugae and G. sessile as synonyms of G. lucidum, but erected the species G. subperforatum from a single collection in Ohio on the basis of having “smooth” spores. Although he did not recognize the genus Ganoderma, but rather kept taxa in the genus, Polyporus, Overholts considered G. sessile as a synonym of the European G. lucidum.

In a 1920 report on Polyporaceae of North America, Murrill conceded that G. sessile was closely related to the European G. lucidum.

Approximately a decade later, Haddow considered G. sessile a unique taxon, but suggested Atkinson's G. subperforatum was a synonym of G. sessile, on the basis of the "smooth" spores – the original basis of G. subperforatum when earlier named by Atkinson in 1908. Until this point, all identifications of Ganoderma taxa were based on fruiting body morphology, geography, host, and spore characters.

In 1948 and then amended in 1965, Nobles characterized the cultural characteristics of numerous wood-inhabiting hymenomycetes, including Ganoderma taxa. Her work laid the foundation for culture-based identifications in this group of fungi. Nobles recognized that there were differences in cultural characteristics between G. oregonense, G. sessile, and G. tsugae. Although Nobles recognized G. lucidum in her 1948 publication as a correct name for the taxon from North American isolates that produce numerous broadly ovoid to elongate chlamydospores (12–21 x 7.5–10.5 μm), she corrected this misnomer in 1968 by amending the name to G. sessile. Others agreed with Haddow's distinction between G. lucidum and G. sessile on the basis of smooth spores, but synonymized G. sessile with G. resinaceum, a previously described European taxon. Others demonstrated the similarity in culture morphology and that vegetative compatibility was successful between the North American taxon recognized as ‘G. lucidum’ and the European G. resinaceum.

In the monograph of North American Polypores written in 1986, which is still the only comprehensive treatise on this group of fungi unique for North America, the authors did not recognize G. sessile, but rather the five species present in the U.S.: G. colossum (Fr.) C.F. Baker (current name: Tomophagus colossus (Fr.) Murrill), G. curtisii, G. lucidum, G. oregonense, and G. tsugae.

=== Molecular taxonomy ===
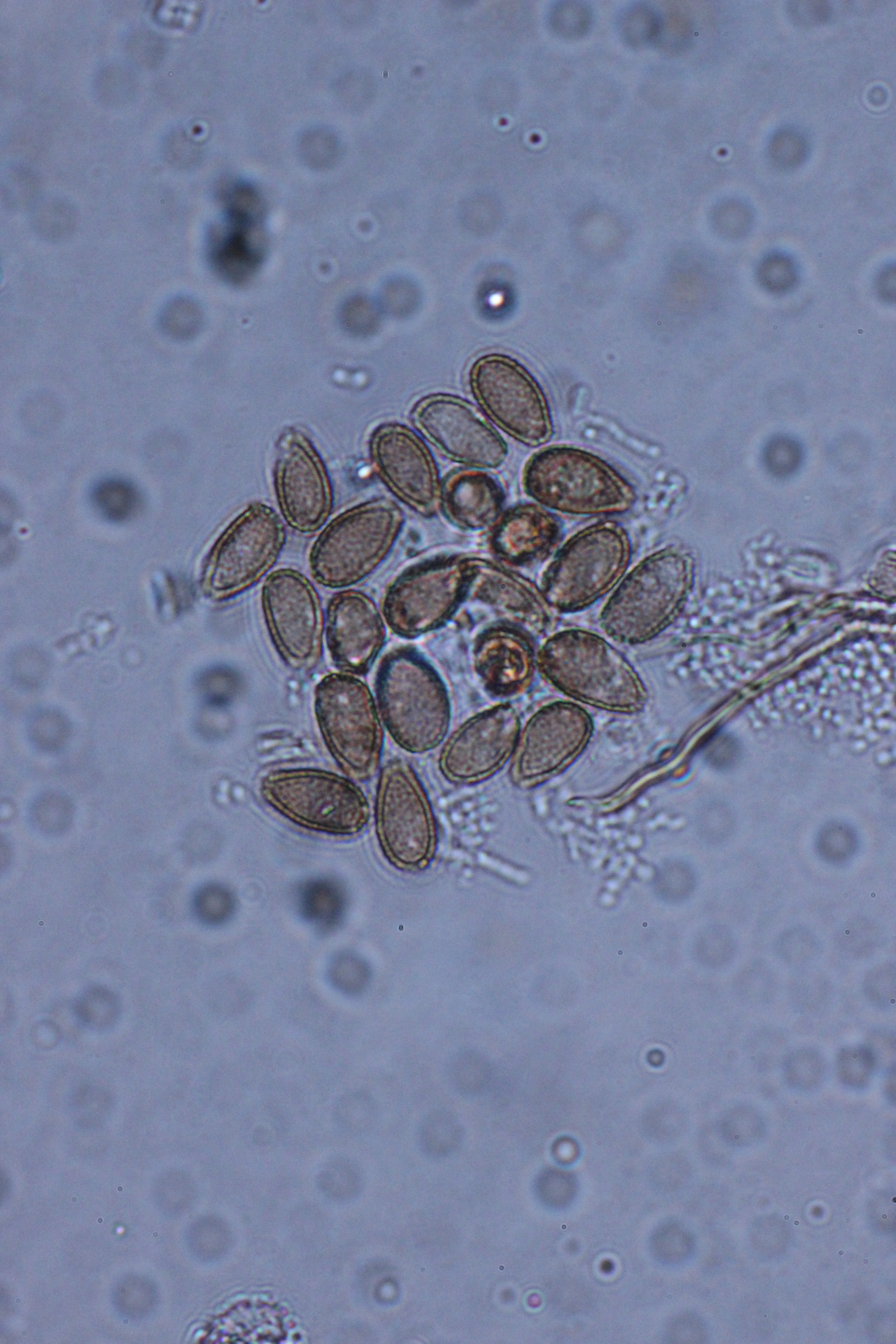
"Smooth" basidiospores of G. sessile at 100x magnification

In a multilocus phylogeny, the authors revealed that the global diversity of the laccate Ganoderma species included three highly supported major lineages that separated G. oregonense/G. tsugae from G. zonatum and from G. curtisii/G. sessile, and these lineages were not correlated to geographical separation. These results agree with several of the earlier works focusing mostly on morphology, geography and host preference showing genetic affinity of G. resinaceum and G. sessile, but with statistical support separating the European and North American taxa. Also, Ganoderma curtisii and G. sessile were separated with high levels of statistical support, although there was not enough information to say they were from distinct lineages. Lastly, G. sessile was not sister to G. lucidum. The phylogeny supported G. tsugae and G. oregonense as sister taxa to the European taxon G. lucdium sensu stricto.

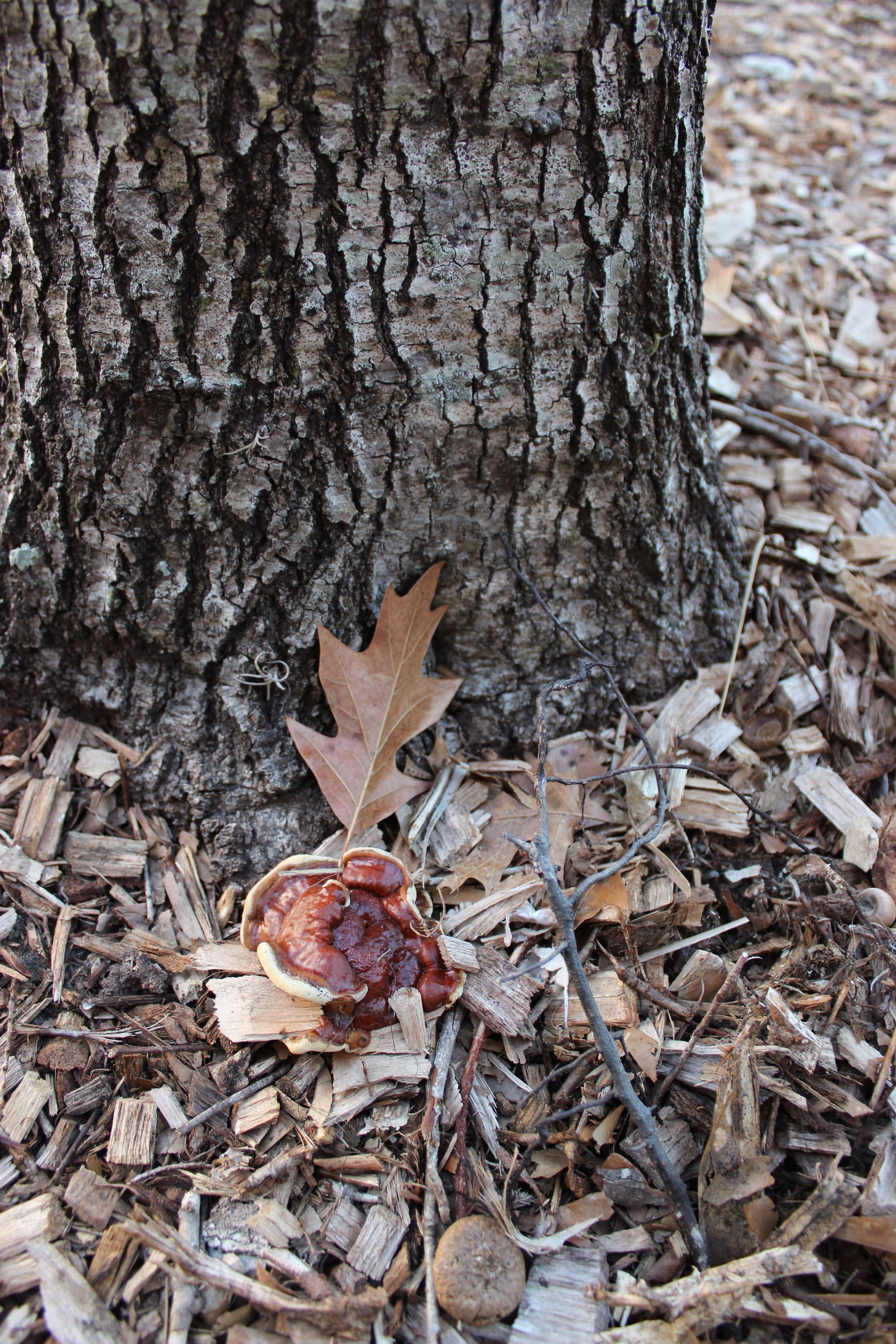
G. sessile fruiting body at base of Quercus shumardii

== Description ==
Fruiting bodies annual and sessile (without a stipe) or pseudostipitate (very small stipe). Fruiting bodies found growing on trunks or root flares of living or dead hardwood trees. Mature fruiting bodies are laccate and reddish-brown, often with a wrinkled margin if dry. Fruiting bodies are shelf-like if on stumps or overlapping clusters of fan-shaped (flabelliform) fruiting bodies if growing from underground roots, and range in size of 3–20 centimetres (1–8 inches) in diameter.

Hymenium white, bruising brown, and poroid with irregular pores that can range in shape from circular to angular. The context tissue is cream colored and can be thin to thick and on average the same length as the tubes. Black resinous deposits are never found embedded in the context tissue, but concentric zones are often found. Spores appear smooth, or nearly so, due to the fine (thin) echinulations from the endosporium.

The spores can be used to differentiate the species from other common Eastern North American species such as Ganoderma curtisii (Berk.) Murrill. Elliptical to obovate to obpyriform chlamydospores formed in vegetative mycelium, and are abundant in cultures.

== Distribution ==
G. sessile is widely distributed in the eastern United States, Mexico, South America, Turkey, South Africa, India, and Southeast Asia.

== Uses ==
For centuries, laccate (varnished or polished) Ganoderma species have been used in traditional Chinese medicine. These species are often sold as G. lucidum', although genetic testing has shown that traditional Chinese medicine uses multiple species, such as G. lingzhi, G. multipileum, and G. sichuanense.
