= Ganodermadiol =

Names
- IUPAC name (24E)-Lanosta-7,9(11),24-triene-3β,26-diol
- Systematic IUPAC name (1R,3aR,5aR,7S,9aS,11aR)-1-[(2R,5E)-7-Hydroxy-6-methylhept-5-en-2-yl]-3a,6,6,9a,11a-pentamethyl-2,3,3a,5,5a,6,7,8,9,9a,11,11a-dodecahydro-1H-cyclopenta[a]phenanthren-7-ol
- Other names Ganoderol B

Identifiers
CAS Number	104700-96-1
3D model (JSmol)	Interactive image
ChEBI	CHEBI:142261
ChEMBL	ChEMBL240972
ChemSpider	10404030
PubChem CID	13934286
UNII	Z99BBB5WR6
CompTox Dashboard (EPA)	DTXSID201045683
- InChI: InChI=1S/C30H48O2/c1-20(19-31)9-8-10-21(2)22-13-17-30(7)24-11-12-25-27(3,4)26(32)15-16-28(25,5)23(24)14-18-29(22,30)6/h9,11,14,21-22,25-26,31-32H,8,10,12-13,15-19H2,1-7H3/b20-9+/t21-,22-,25+,26+,28-,29-,30+/m1/s1 Key: AOXXVRDKZLRGTJ-AZIDVCJLSA-N
- SMILES: C[C@H](CC/C=C(\C)/CO)[C@H]1CC[C@@]2([C@@]1(CC=C3C2=CC[C@@H]4[C@@]3(CC[C@@H](C4(C)C)O)C)C)C

Properties
Chemical formula	C_{30}H_{48}O_{2}
Molar mass	440.712 g·mol^{−1}
- Except where otherwise noted, data are given for materials in their standard state (at 25 °C [77 °F], 100 kPa). Infobox references

Ganodermadiol (ganoderol B) is a sterol with antiviral properties against influenza virus A and HSV type 1 isolated from Ganoderma.
