= Ganoderiol =

Chemical compound

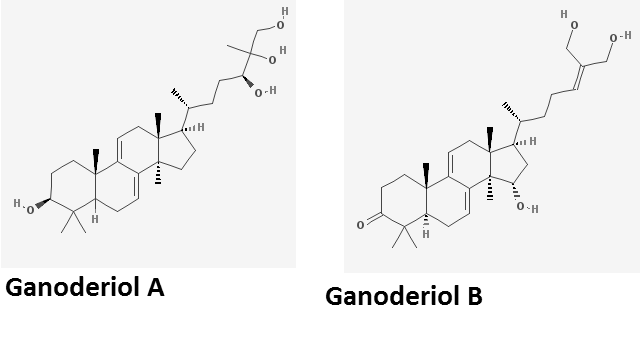
Ganoderiol A and B

Ganoderiols are bio-active sterols isolated from Ganoderma lucidum.

Molecular Formula	$\ce{C30H50O4}$
Molecular Weight	474.7 g/mol
Covalently-Bonded Unit Count	1
Complexity	860
