= Ganoderol A =

Identifiers
CAS Number	104700-97-2
3D model (JSmol)	Interactive image
ChemSpider	10404029
PubChem CID	146156323
CompTox Dashboard (EPA)	DTXSID201047946
- InChI: InChI=1S/C30H46O2/c1-20(19-31)9-8-10-21(2)22-13-17-30(7)24-11-12-25-27(3,4)26(32)15-16-28(25,5)23(24)14-18-29(22,30)6/h9,11,14,21-22,25,31H,8,10,12-13,15-19H2,1-7H3/b20-9+ Key: QWFPQDGDUOGOJF-AWQFTUOYSA-N
- SMILES: CC(CC/C=C(\C)/CO)C1CCC2(C1(CC=C3C2=CCC4C3(CCC(=O)C4(C)C)C)C)C

Properties
Chemical formula	C_{30}H_{46}O_{2}
- Except where otherwise noted, data are given for materials in their standard state (at 25 °C [77 °F], 100 kPa). Infobox references

Ganoderol A is a triterpene isolated from Ganoderma lucidum.
